This is a complete list of all 1844 Statutory Instruments published in the United Kingdom in the year 1993.


1-100
 Environmental Protection (Controls on Injurious Substances) Regulations 1993 (S.I. 1993/1)
 Rail Crossing Extinguishment and Diversion Orders Regulations 1993 (S.I. 1993/9)
 Town and Country Planning (Public Path Orders) Regulations 1993 (S.I. 1993/10)
 Public Path Orders Regulations 1993 (S.I. 1993/11)
 Wildlife and Countryside (Definitive Maps and Statements) Regulations 1993 (S.I. 1993/12)
 Food Protection (Emergency Prohibitions) (Radioactivity in Sheep) Partial Revocation Order 1993 (S.I. 1993/13)
 Animals (Post-Import Control) Order 1993 (S.I. 1993/14)
 Genetically Modified Organisms (Contained Use) Regulations 1993 (S.I. 1993/15)
 Friendly Societies Act 1992 (Commencement No. 3 and Transitional Provisions) Order 1993 (S.I. 1993/16)
 Food Protection (Emergency Prohibitions) (Oil and Chemical Pollution of Fish) Order 1993 (S.I. 1993/17)
 Wireless Telegraphy Apparatus (Land Mobile-Satellite Service) (Low Bit Rate Data) (Exemption) Regulations 1993 (S.I. 1993/21)
 Local Government Finance (Miscellaneous Provisions) (England) Order 1993 (S.I. 1993/22)
 Lanarkshire (Hamilton) Enterprise Zones Designation Order 1993 (S.I. 1993/23)
 Lanarkshire (Motherwell) Enterprise Zones Designation Order 1993 (S.I. 1993/24)
 Lanarkshire (Monklands) Enterprise Zones Designation Order 1993 (S.I. 1993/25)
 Mayday Healthcare National Health Service Trust (Establishment) Order 1993 (S.I. 1993/27)
 Warrington Hospital National Health Service Trust (Establishment) Order 1993 (S.I. 1993/28)
 West Midlands Ambulance Service National Health Service Trust (Establishment) Order 1993 (S.I. 1993/29)
 Income Support (General) Amendment Regulations 1993 (S.I. 1993/30)
 Motor Vehicles (Wearing of Seat Belts by Children in Front Seats) Regulations 1993 (S.I. 1993/31)
 Food Protection (Emergency Prohibitions) (Radioactivity in Sheep) (Wales) (Partial Revocation) Order 1993 (S.I. 1993/32)
 Food Protection (Emergency Prohibitions) (Radioactivity in Sheep) (England) (Partial Revocation) Order 1993 (S.I. 1993/33)
 North West London Mental Health National Health Service Trust (Establishment) Order 1993 (S.I. 1993/34)
 Road Traffic Regulation Act 1984 (Amendment) Order 1993 (S.I. 1993/35)
 Local Authorities (Discretionary Expenditure) (Relevant Population) Regulations 1993 (S.I. 1993/40)
 Local Authorities (Discretionary Expenditure Limits) Order 1993 (S.I. 1993/41)
 Control of Pollution (Anglers' Lead Weights) (Amendment) Regulations 1993 (S.I. 1993/49)
 Gipsy Encampments (London Borough of Bromley) Order 1993 (S.I. 1993/50)
 Licensed Betting Offices (Amendment) Regulations 1993 (S.I. 1993/51)
 Combined Probation Areas (Powys) Order 1993 (S.I. 1993/52)
 National Rivers Authority (Anglian Region) (Reconstitution of the Alford Drainage Board) Order 1992 S.I. 1993/53)
 National Rivers Authority (Anglian Region) (Reconstruction of the North East Lindsey Internal Drainage Board) Order 1992 S.I. 1993/54)
 National Rivers Authority (Anglian Region) (Reconstitution of the Louth Drainage Board) Order 1992 S.I. 1993/55)
 Education (Higher Education Corporations) (Wales) (No. 3) Order 1993 (S.I. 1993/56)
 Friendly Societies (Group Schemes) Regulations 1993 (S.I. 1993/59)
 Friendly Societies (Qualifications of Actuaries) Regulations 1993 (S.I. 1993/60)
 National Rivers Authority (Levies) Regulations 1993 (S.I. 1993/61)
 A23 Trunk Road (Brighton Road, Croydon) (Box Junction) Order 1993 (S.I. 1993/62)
 Drivers' Hours (Passenger and Goods Vehicles) (Exemption) Regulations 1993 (S.I. 1993/66)
 Community Drivers' Hours (Passenger and Goods Vehicles) (Temporary Exception) Regulations 1993 (S.I. 1993/67)
 Licensed Betting Offices (Amendment) Scotland Regulations 1993 (S.I. 1993/68)
 Merchant Shipping (Navigational Equipment) Regulations 1993 (S.I. 1993/69)
 Hill Livestock (Compensatory Allowances) (Amendment) Regulations 1993 (S.I. 1993/70)
 Combined Probation Areas (Cornwall) Order 1993 (S.I. 1993/71)
 Education (Training Grants) Regulations 1993 (S.I. 1993/72)
 Copyright (Recording for Archives of Designated Class of Broadcasts and Cable Programmes) (Designated Bodies) Order 1993 (S.I. 1993/74)
 Housing Revenue Account General Fund Contribution Limits (Scotland) Order 1993 (S.I. 1993/75)
 A435 Trunk Road (Alcester to Gorcott Hill) De-Trunking Order 1993 (S.I. 1993/80)
 A435 Trunk Road (Studley Bypass and Slip Roads) Order 1993 (S.I. 1993/81)
 Environmentally Sensitive Areas (North Kent Marshes) Designation Order 1993 (S.I. 1993/82)
 Environmentally Sensitive Areas (Exmoor) Designation Order 1993 (S.I. 1993/83)
 Environmentally Sensitive Areas (Avon Valley) Designation Order 1993 (S.I. 1993/84)
 Environmentally Sensitive Areas (Lake District) Designation Order 1993 (S.I. 1993/85)
 Environmentally Sensitive Areas (South Wessex Downs) Designation Order 1993 (S.I. 1993/86)
 Environmentally Sensitive Areas (South West Peak) Designation Order 1993 (S.I. 1993/87)
 A23 Trunk Road (London Road, Croydon) (Prescribed Routes) Order 1993 (S.I. 1993/88)
 Higher Education (Wales) (Revocation) Regulations 1993 (S.I. 1993/89)
 Combined Probation Areas (Amendment) Order 1993 (S.I. 1993/92)
 Education (Further Education Corporations) Order 1993 (S.I. 1993/97)
 Friendly Societies (Insurance Business) Regulations 1993 (S.I. 1993/98)
 Friendly Societies (Authorisation) Regulations 1993 (S.I. 1993/99)
 Air Fares (Amendment) Regulations 1993 (S.I. 1993/100)

101-200
 Licensing of Air Carriers (Amendment) Regulations 1993 (S.I. 1993/101)
 Local Government and Housing Act 1989 (Commencement No. 15) Order 1993 (S.I. 1993/105)
 Education (School Financial Statements) (Prescribed Particulars etc.) Regulations 1993 (S.I. 1993/113)
 Teachers' Superannuation (Amendment) Regulations 1993 (S.I. 1993/114)
 British Railways (Penalty Fares) Act 1989 (Activating No. 8) Order 1993 (S.I. 1993/115)
 A31 Trunk Road (Ashley Heath Grade Separated Junction) Order 1993 (S.I. 1993/116)
 Local Government Act 1988 (Defined Activities) (Exemption) (Boothferry Borough Council) Order 1993 (S.I. 1993/117)
 Act of Sederunt (Fees of Messengers-at-Arms) 1993 (S.I. 1993/118)
 Value Added Tax (General) (Amendment) Regulations 1993 (S.I. 1993/119)
 Act of Sederunt (Fees of Sheriff Officers) 1993 (S.I. 1993/120)
 Testing in Primary Schools (Scotland) Revocation Regulations 1993 (S.I. 1993/121)
 East Birmingham Hospital National Health Service Trust (Change of Name) Order 1993 (S.I. 1993/122)
 Teddington Memorial Hospital National Health Service Trust (Establishment) Order 1993 (S.I. 1993/123)
 Revenue Support Grant (Specified Bodies) (Amendment) Regulations 1993 (S.I. 1993/139)
 A35 Trunk Road (40 mph Speed Limit) Order 2003 (S.I. 1993/142)
 Food Protection (Emergency Prohibitions) (Oil and Chemical Pollution of Fish) (No.2) Order 1993 (S.I. 1993/143)
 Council Tax (Additional Provisions for Discount Disregards) (Amendment) Regulations 1993 (S.I. 1993/149)
 Council Tax (Exempt Dwellings) (Amendment) Order 1993 (S.I. 1993/150)
 Council Tax (Liability for Owners) (Amendment) Regulations 1993 (S.I. 1993/151)
 Genetically Modified Organisms (Deliberate Release) Regulationa 1993 (S.I. 1993/152)
 Barnsley Community and Priority Services National Health Service Trust (Transfer of Trust Property) Order 1993 (S.I. 1993/153)
 Mersey Regional Ambulance Service National Health Service Trust (Transfer of Trust Property) Order 1993 (S.I. 1993/154)
 North Mersey Community National Health Service Trust (Establishment) Amendment Order 1993 (S.I. 1993/155)
 Shropshire's Mental Health National Health Service Trust (Establishment) Amendment Order 1993 (S.I. 1993/156)
 Thameside Community Health Care National Health Service Trust (Change of Name) Order 1993 (S.I. 1993/157)
 Drivers' Hours (Passenger and Goods Vehicles) (Exemption) (Revocation) Regulations 1993 (S.I. 1993/158)
 Manchester Central Hospitals and Community Care National Health Service Trust (Change of Name) Order 1993 (S.I. 1993/159)
 A30 and A39 Trunk Roads (Indian Queens, Fraddon and St Columb Road Bypasses and Slip Roads) Order 1993 (S.I. 1993/163)
 A30 and A39 Trunk Roads (Indian Queens, Fraddon and St Columb Road Bypasses) (Detrunking) Order 1993 (S.I. 1993/164)
 General Drainage Charges (Relevant Quotient) Regulations 1993 (S.I. 1993/165)
 Central Rating Lists (Amendment) Regulations 1993 (S.I. 1993/166)
 Spring Traps Approval (Scotland) Variation Order 1993 (S.I. 1993/167)
 Humberside and South Yorkshire (County Boundaries) Order 1993 (S.I. 1993/168)
 Special Road Schemes and Highways Orders (Procedure) Regulations 1993 (S.I. 1993/169)
 Combined Probation Areas (Kent) Order 1993 (S.I. 1993/173)
 Insurance Companies (Amendment) Regulations 1993 (S.I. 1993/174)
 Council Tax (Transitional Reduction Scheme) (England) Regulations 1993 (S.I. 1993/175)
 Motor Vehicles (Wearing of Seat Belts) Regulations 1993 (S.I. 1993/176)
 Loch Crinan Scallops Fishery Order 1993 (S.I. 1993/177)
 Local Government Act 1988 (Defined Activities) (Specified Periods) (Scotland) Amendment Regulations 1993 (S.I. 1993/178)
 Air Navigation (Dangerous Goods) (Fourth Amendment) Regulations 1992 S.I. 1993/179)
 City of London (Non-Domestic Rating Multiplier) Order 1993 (S.I. 1993/180)
 Sea Fish Licensing (Variation) Order 1993 (S.I. 1993/188)
 Spring Traps Approval (Variation) Order 1993 (S.I. 1993/189)
 New Severn Bridge (Restriction of Navigation) Regulations 1993 (S.I. 1993/190)
 Council Tax and Non-Domestic Rating (Demand Notices) (England) Regulations 1993 (S.I. 1993/191)
 Value Added Tax Act 1983 (Interest on Overpayments etc.) (Prescribed Rate) Order 1993 (S.I. 1993/192)
 Copyright (Certification of Licensing Scheme for Educational Recording of Broadcasts and Cable Programmes) (Educational Recording Agency Limited) (Amendment) Order 1993 (S.I. 1993/193)
 Local Government Finance Act 1992 (Commencement No. 7 and Amendment) Order 1993 (S.I. 1993/194)
 Council Tax (Reductions for Disabilities) (Amendment) Regulations 1993 (S.I. 1993/195)
 Council Tax (Administration and Enforcement) (Amendment) Regulations 1993 (S.I. 1993/196)
 Friendly Societies Act 1992 (Commencement No. 4) Order 1993 (S.I. 1993/197)
 St Vincent's Home Instrument of Management (Variation) Order 1993 (S.I. 1993/198)
 Protection of Wrecks (MV Braer) Order 1993 (S.I. 1993/199)

201-300
 Local Authorities (Standing Orders) Regulations 1993 (S.I. 1993/202)
 Furniture and Furnishings (Fire) (Safety) (Amendment) Regulations 1993 (S.I. 1993/207)
 Coal and Other Safety-Lamp Mines (Explosives) Regulations 1993 (S.I. 1993/208)
 Poultry Meat (Hygiene) (Amendment) Regulations 1993 (S.I. 1993/209)
 Liverpool Housing Action Trust (Area and Constitution) Order 1993 Approved by both Houses of Parliament S.I. 1993/210)
 Education (Designated Institutions in Further Education) (Wales) Order 1993 (S.I. 1993/215)
 Non-Domestic Rates (Scotland) Order 1993 (S.I. 1993/216)
 Superannuation (Children's Pensions) (Earnings Limit) Order 1993 (S.I. 1993/220)
 Insolvency Practitioners (Amendment) Regulations 1993 (S.I. 1993/221)
 Taxes (Interest Rate) (Amendment) Regulations 1993 (S.I. 1993/222)
 Drainage Rates (Forms) Regulations 1993 (S.I. 1993/223)
 Foreign Compensation (Financial Provisions) Order 1993 (S.I. 1993/224)
 Aircraft and Shipbuilding Industries (Repeals) (Northern Ireland) Order 1992 S.I. 1993/225)
 District Electoral Areas (Northern Ireland) Order 1993 (S.I. 1993/226)
 Parliamentary Constituencies (Wales) (Miscellaneous Changes) Order 1993 (S.I. 1993/227)
 Academic Awards and Distinctions (Queen Margaret College) (Scotland) Order of Council 1993 (S.I. 1993/230)
 Air Navigation (Third Amendment) Order 1993 (S.I. 1993/231)
 Local Government Finance Act 1992 (Community Charge Benefit) Savings and Transitional Order 1993 (S.I. 1993/232)
 Funds for Trade Union Ballots Regulations (Revocation) Regulations 1993 (S.I. 1993/233)
 Non-Domestic Rates (Levying) (Scotland) Regulations 1993 (S.I. 1993/234)
 Poultry Meat (Hygiene) (Scotland) Amendment Regulations 1993 (S.I. 1993/235)
 Finance (No. 2) Act 1992, Schedule 9, (Appointed Day) Order 1993 (S.I. 1993/236)
 Criminal Justice Act 1988 (Application to Service Courts) (Evidence through Television Links) Order 1993 (S.I. 1993/244)
 Police (Promotion) (Scotland) Amendment Regulations 1993 (S.I. 1993/251)
 Non-Domestic Rating (Demand Notices) (Wales) Regulations 1993 (S.I. 1993/252)
 Council Tax (Transitional Reduction Scheme) (England) (Amendment) Regulations 1993 (S.I. 1993/253)
 Rules of the Air (Amendment) Regulations 1993 (S.I. 1993/254)
 Council Tax (Demand Notices) (Wales) Regulations 1993 (S.I. 1993/255)
 Valuation Timetable (Scotland) Amendment Order 1993 (S.I. 1993/256)
 Salmon (Definition of Methods of Net Fishing and Construction of Nets) (Scotland) Amendment Regulations 1993 (S.I. 1993/257)
 A417 Trunk Road (Brockworth Bypass and Slip Roads) Order 1993 (S.I. 1993/259)
 Social Security (Contributions) Amendment Regulations 1993 (S.I. 1993/260)
 A417 Trunk Road (Brockworth Bypass and Slip Roads) (Detrunking) Order 1993 (S.I. 1993/261)
 M5 Motorway (Brockworth Bypass and Slip Roads) (Slip Roads, Special Roads) Scheme 1993 (S.I. 1993/262)
 Industrial Training Levy (Construction Board) Order 1993 (S.I. 1993/265)
 Industrial Training Levy (Engineering Construction Board) Order 1993 (S.I. 1993/266)
 A4 Trunk Road (Reading Eastern Boundary to Maidenhead Thicket) Detrunking Order 1993 (S.I. 1993/267)
 Local Government Act 1988 (Defined Activities) (Specified Period) (Woking Borough Council) Regulations 1993 (S.I. 1993/268)
 Education (Further Education Corporations) Order 1993 (S.I. 1993/269)
 Education (St Austell Sixth Form College and Mid-Cornwall College) (Dissolution) Order 1993 (S.I. 1993/270)
 St Austell College (Government) Regulations 1993 (S.I. 1993/271)
 Hereford and Worcester and Warwickshire (County Boundaries) Order 1993 (S.I. 1993/272)
 Housing and Planning Act 1986 (Commencement No. 18 and Transitional Provisions) (Scotland) Order 1993 (S.I. 1993/273)
 Environmental Protection Act 1990 (Commencement No. 13) Order 1993 (S.I. 1993/274)
 Planning and Compensation Act 1991 (Commencement No. 15) (Scotland) Order 1993 (S.I. 1993/275)
 River Tay Catchment Area Protection (Renewal) Order 1993 (S.I. 1993/276)
 Council Tax (Transitional Reduction Scheme) (Scotland) Regulations 1993 (S.I. 1993/277)
 Removal and Disposal of Vehicles (Amendment) Regulations 1993 (S.I. 1993/278)
 Guaranteed Minimum Pensions Increase Order 1993 (S.I. 1993/279)
 Social Security (Contributions) (Re-rating) Order 1993 (S.I. 1993/280)
 Social Security (Contributions) Amendment (No. 2) Regulations 1993 (S.I. 1993/281)
 Social Security (Contributions) Amendment (No. 3) Regulations 1993 (S.I. 1993/282)
 A63 Trunk Road (Selby Bypass) Order 1993 (S.I. 1993/286)
 A1041 Trunk Road (The Crescent to Brayton Lane) (De-trunking) Order 1993 (S.I. 1993/287)
 A63 Trunk Road (Whinny Hagg Lane to Magazine Road) (De-trunking) Order 1993 (S.I. 1993/288)
 National Health Service Trusts (Originating Capital Debt) Order 1993 (S.I. 1993/289)
 Council Tax (Alteration of Lists and Appeals) Regulations 1993 (S.I. 1993/290)
 Non-Domestic Rating (Alteration of Lists and Appeals) Regulations 1993 (S.I. 1993/291)
 Valuation and Community Charge Tribunals (Amendment) Regulations 1993 (S.I. 1993/292)
 A65 Trunk Road (Manor Park Improvement) Order 1993 (S.I. 1993/293)
 A65 Trunk Road (Denton Bridge to Black Bull Farm) (De-Trunking) Order 1993 (S.I. 1993/294)
 Family Proceedings (Amendment) Rules 1993 (S.I. 1993/295)
 Lands Tribunal for Scotland (Amendment) (Fees) Rules 1993 (S.I. 1993/296)
 Scottish Land Court (Fees) Order 1993 (S.I. 1993/297)
 Lyon Court and Office Fees (Variation) Order 1993 (S.I. 1993/298)

301-400
 Goods Vehicles (Operators' Licences, Qualifications and Fees) (Amendment) Regulations 1993 (S.I. 1993/301)
 Mines (Shafts and Winding) Regulations 1993 (S.I. 1993/302)
 Housing (Right to Buy) (Priority of Charges) Order 1993 (S.I. 1993/303)
 Mortgage Indemnities (Recognised Bodies) Order 1993 (S.I. 1993/304)
 Folkestone-Brighton-Southampton-Dorchester-Honiton Trunk Road (Guestling Thorn Diversion) (Revocation) Order 1993 (S.I. 1993/305)
 Local Authorities (Capital Finance) (Rate of Discount for 1993/94) Regulations 1993 (S.I. 1993/312)
 Police (Amendment) Regulations 1993 (S.I. 1993/313)
 Gipsy Encampments (City and District of St. Albans) Order 1993 (S.I. 1993/314)
 Income-related Benefits Schemes (Miscellaneous Amendments) Regulations 1993 (S.I. 1993/315)
 Social Security (Invalid Care Allowance) Amendment Regulations 1993 (S.I. 1993/316)
 Housing Benefit (General) Amendment Regulations 1993 (S.I. 1993/317)
 Humberside Ambulance Service National Health Service Trust (Establishment) Amendment Order 1993 TI> S.I. 1993/318)
 Maidstone Priority Care National Health Service Trust (Establishment) Amendment Order 1993 (S.I. 1993/319)
 Royal Bournemouth and Christchurch Hospitals National Health Service Trust (Transfer of Trust Property) Order 1993 (S.I. 1993/320)
 Caledonian MacBrayne Limited (Armadale) Harbour Revision Order 1992 S.I. 1993/321)
 Revenue Support Grant (Scotland) Order 1993 (S.I. 1993/322)
 Town and Country Planning (Hazardous Substances) (Scotland) Regulations 1993 (S.I. 1993/323)
 A23 Trunk Road (Streatham High Road, Lambeth) (Box Junction) Order 1993 (S.I. 1993/335)
 Southport and Formby National Health Service Trust (Transfer of Trust Property) Order 1993 (S.I. 1993/336)
 Bassetlaw Hospital and Community Services National Health Service Trust (Transfer of Trust Property) Order 1993 (S.I. 1993/337)
 Dorset Healthcare National Health Service Trust (Transfer of Trust Property) Order 1993 (S.I. 1993/338)
 Southmead Health Services National Health Service Trust (Transfer of Trust Property) Order 1993 (S.I. 1993/339)
 Central Region (Electoral Arrangements) Order 1993 (S.I. 1993/340)
 Local Government Finance (Scotland) Order 1993 (S.I. 1993/341)
 Council Tax (Discounts) (Scotland) Amendment Regulations 1993 (S.I. 1993/342)
 Council Tax (Discounts) (Scotland) Amendment Order 1993 (S.I. 1993/343)
 Council Tax (Liability of Owners) (Scotland) Amendment Regulations 1993 (S.I. 1993/344)
 Council Tax (Exempt Dwellings) (Scotland) Amendment Order 1993 (S.I. 1993/345)
 Consumer Credit (Exempt Agreements) (Amendment) Order 1993 (S.I. 1993/346)
 Training for Work (Miscellaneous Provisions) Order 1993 (S.I. 1993/348)
 Social Security Benefits Up-rating Order 1993 (S.I. 1993/349)
 Statutory Sick Pay (Rate of Payment) Order 1993 (S.I. 1993/350)
 Poole Hospital National Health Service Trust (Transfer of Trust Property) Order 1993 (S.I. 1993/351)
 St George's Healthcare National Health Service Trust (Establishment) Order 1993 (S.I. 1993/352)
 Chester and Halton Community National Health Service Trust (Transfer of Trust Property) Order 1993 (S.I. 1993/353)
 Council Tax (Valuation of Dwellings) (Scotland) Amendment Regulations 1993 (S.I. 1993/354)
 Council Tax (Alteration of Lists and Appeals) (Scotland) Regulations 1993 (S.I. 1993/355)
 Poultry Laying Flocks (Testing and Registration etc.) (Revocation) Order 1993 (S.I. 1993/357)
 A249 Trunk Road (M2 to Bobbing Improvement) Order 1993 (S.I. 1993/360)
 A249 Trunk Road (M2 to Bobbing Improvement Slip Roads) Order 1993 (S.I. 1993/361)
 A249 Trunk Road (M2 to Bobbing Improvement Detrunking) Order 1993 (S.I. 1993/362)
 M66 Motorway (Manchester Outer Ring Road, Denton to Middleton Section) A663 Broadway All-Purpose Connecting Road Order 1993 (S.I. 1993/363)
 M66 Motorway (Manchester Outer Ring Road, Denton to Middleton Section) and Connecting Roads Scheme 1988 Amendment Scheme 1993 (S.I. 1993/364)
 Local Government Act 1988 (Defined Activities) (Exemption) (Greater Manchester Fire and Civil Defence Authority) Order 1993 (S.I. 1993/365)
 Local Government Superannuation (Amendment) Regulations 1993 (S.I. 1993/366)
 Probation (Amendment) Rules 1993 (S.I. 1993/367)
 Criminal Justice Act 1991 (Contracted Out Prisons) Order 1993 (S.I. 1993/368)
 Scottish Hospital Trust Scheme 1993 (S.I. 1993/372)
 Registration of Births, Deaths and Marriages (Fees) (Amendment) Order 1993 (S.I. 1993/377)
 Cheshire, Lancashire and Merseyside (County Boundaries) Order 1993 (S.I. 1993/378)
 Norfolk and Suffolk Broads (Extension of Byelaws) Order 1993 (S.I. 1993/379)
 Defence Research Agency Trading Fund Order 1993 (S.I. 1993/380)
 Sea Fishing (Enforcement of Community Quota Measures) Order 1993 (S.I. 1993/387)
 Derbyshire and South Yorkshire (County and District Boundaries) Order 1993 (S.I. 1993/393)
 Cheshire and Merseyside (County and Metropolitan Borough Boundaries) Order 1993 (S.I. 1993/394)
 Sugar Beet (Research and Education) Order 1993 (S.I. 1993/397)
 A140 Trunk Road (Scole – Dickleburgh Improvement) Order 1993 (S.I. 1993/398)
 A140 Trunk Road (Scole - Dickleburgh Improvement) Detrunking Order 1993 (S.I. 1993/399)
 Greater London, Kent and Surrey (County Boundaries) Order 1993 (S.I. 1993/400)

401-500
 Billing Authorities (Alteration of Requisite Calculations and Transitional Reduction Scheme) (England) Regulations 1993 (S.I. 1993/401)
 Staffordshire, Warwickshire and West Midlands (County Boundaries) Order 1993 (S.I. 1993/402)
 Education (Designated Institutions) Order 1993 (S.I. 1993/404)
 Organic Products (Amendment) Regulations 1993 (S.I. 1993/405)
 Outer Space Act 1986 (Fees) (Amendment) Regulations 1993 (S.I. 1993/406)
 Local Authorities (Recovery of Costs for Public Path Orders) Regulations 1993 (S.I. 1993/407)
 Social Security (Introduction of Disability Living Allowance) (Amendment) Regulations 1993 (S.I. 1993/408)
 National Health Service Trusts (Membership and Procedure) (Scotland) Amendment Regulations 1993 (S.I. 1993/412)
 National Health Service Trusts (Originating Capital Debt) Order 1993 (S.I. 1993/413)
 Lloyd's Underwriters (Tax) (1990–91) Regulations 1993 (S.I. 1993/415)
 Seeds (National Lists of Varieties) (Fees) (Amendment) Regulations 1993 (S.I. 1993/416)
 National Health Service (Optical Charges and Payments) Amendment Regulations 1993 (S.I. 1993/418)
 National Health Service (Dental Charges) Amendment Regulations 1993 (S.I. 1993/419)
 National Health Service (Charges for Drugs and Appliances) Amendment Regulations 1993 (S.I. 1993/420)
 Finance Act 1985 (Interest on Tax) (Prescribed Rate) Order 1993 (S.I. 1993/421)
 Workmen's Compensation (Supplementation) (Amendment) Scheme 1993 (S.I. 1993/422)
 Glasgow Caledonian University (Establishment) (Scotland) Order 1993 (S.I. 1993/423)
 Designation of Institutions of Higher Education (Scotland) Amendment Order 1993 (S.I. 1993/424)
 High Court of Justiciary Fees Amendment Order 1993 (S.I. 1993/426)
 Court of Session etc. Fees Amendment Order 1993 (S.I. 1993/427)
 Sheriff Court Fees Amendment Order 1993 (S.I. 1993/428)
 Seeds (Fees) (Amendment) Regulations 1993 (S.I. 1993/429)
 Plant Breeders' Rights (Fees) (Amendment) Regulations 1993 (S.I. 1993/430)
 Education (PCFC and UFC Staff) Order 1993 (S.I. 1993/434)
 Education (Designated Institutions in Further Education) Order 1993 (S.I. 1993/435)
 Cheshire, Greater Manchester, Lancashire and Merseyside (County and District Boundaries) Order 1993 (S.I. 1993/436)
 Hereford and Worcester, Warwickshire and West Midlands (County and Metropolitan Borough Boundaries) Order 1993 (S.I. 1993/437)
 Bankruptcy (Scotland) Act 1993 Commencement and Savings Order 1993 (S.I. 1993/438)
 Bankruptcy (Scotland) Amendment Regulations 1993 (S.I. 1993/439)
 Essex, Greater London and Hertfordshire (County and London Borough Boundaries) Order 1993 (S.I. 1993/441)
 Derbyshire and Nottinghamshire (County Boundaries) Order 1993 (S.I. 1993/444)
 Environmental Protection (Waste Recycling Payments) (Amendment) Regulations 1993 (S.I. 1993/445)
 National Rivers Authority (Severn-Trent Region) (Reconstitution of the South Gloucestershire Internal Drainage Board) Order 1992 S.I. 1993/451)
 Alteration of Boundaries of the Beverley and North Holderness Internal Drainage District Order 1993 (S.I. 1993/452)
 Reconstitution of the South Holland Internal Drainage Board Order 1993 (S.I. 1993/453)
 National Rivers Authority (Anglian Region) (Reconstitution of the North Level Internal Drainage Board) Order 1992 S.I. 1993/454)
 Environmentally Sensitive Areas (Breckland) Designation Order 1993 (S.I. 1993/455)
 Environmentally Sensitive Areas (Clun) Designation Order 1993 (S.I. 1993/456)
 Environmentally Sensitive Areas (North Peak) Designation Order 1993 (S.I. 1993/457)
 Environmentally Sensitive Areas (Suffolk River Valleys) Designation Order 1993 (S.I. 1993/458)
 Environmentally Sensitive Areas (Test Valley) Designation Order 1993 (S.I. 1993/459)
 Environmentally Sensitive Areas (Pennine Dales) Designation (Amendment) Order 1993 (S.I. 1993/460)
 National Assistance (Sums for Personal Requirements) Regulations 1993 (S.I. 1993/462)
 Education (Further Education Corporations) (Designated Staff) Order 1993 (S.I. 1993/465)
 Bradford, Kirklees and Leeds (City and Metropolitan Borough Boundaries) Order 1993 (S.I. 1993/473)
 Warwickshire and West Midlands (County and District Boundaries) Order 1993 (S.I. 1993/474)
 Merchant Shipping (Light Dues) (Amendment) Regulations 1993 (S.I. 1993/475)
 Wireless Telegraphy (Television Licence Fees) (Amendment) Regulations 1993 (S.I. 1993/476)
 Residential Accommodation (Relevant Premises, Ordinary Residence and Exemptions) Regulations 1993 (S.I. 1993/477)
 Social Security (Claims and Payments) Amendment Regulations 1993 (S.I. 1993/478)
 Social Fund Maternity and Funeral Expenses (General) Amendment Regulations 1993 (S.I. 1993/479)
 Personal Injuries (Civilians) Amendment Scheme 1993 (S.I. 1993/480)
 Education (Prescribed Courses of Higher Education) (Wales) Regulations 1993 (S.I. 1993/481)
 General Optical Council (Registration and Enrolment (Amendment) Rules) Order of Council 1993 (S.I. 1993/483)
 Housing Benefit and Community Charge Benefit (Subsidy) Order 1993 (S.I. 1993/484)
 Housing Benefit and Community Charge Benefit (Subsidy) Amendment Regulations 1993 (S.I. 1993/485)
 Bankruptcy Fees (Scotland) Regulations 1993 (S.I. 1993/486)
 Registered Housing Associations (Accounting Requirements) (Scotland) Order 1993 (S.I. 1993/487)
 National Health Service (Fund-Holding Practices) (Scotland) Regulations 1993 (S.I. 1993/488)
 Grant-aided Colleges (Scotland) Grant Amendment Regulations 1993 (S.I. 1993/489)
 Jordanhill College of Education (Closure) (Scotland) Order 1993 (S.I. 1993/490)
 Banking Act 1987 (Disclosure of Information) (Specified Persons) Order 1993 (S.I. 1993/491)
 Hereford and Worcester, Staffordshire and West Midlands (County and Metropolitan Borough Boundaries) Order 1993 (S.I. 1993/492)
 Cheshire, Derbyshire and Greater Manchester (County and District Boundaries) Order 1993 (S.I. 1993/493)
 Council Tax (Deductions from Income Support) Regulations 1993 (S.I. 1993/494)
 Deductions from Income Support (Miscellaneous Amendment) Regulations 1993 (S.I. 1993/495)
 Pembrokeshire National Health Service Trust (Originating Capital Debt) Order 1993 (S.I. 1993/496)
 Housing Support Grant (Scotland) Order 1993 (S.I. 1993/497)
 Training for Work (Scottish Enterprise and Highlands and Islands Enterprise Programmes) Order 1993 (S.I. 1993/498)
 Civil Aviation (Navigation Services Charges) (Second Amendment) Regulations 1993 (S.I. 1993/499)
 Water Supply and Sewerage Services (Customer Service Standards) (Amendment) Regulations 1993 (S.I. 1993/500)

501-600
 Local Government Finance Act 1992 (Community Charge Benefits) Saving Order 1993 (S.I. 1993/502)
 Bovine Animals (Identification, Marking and Breeding Records) (Amendment) Order 1993 (S.I. 1993/503)
 Prisoner Escorts Rules 1993 (S.I. 1993/515)
 Prison (Amendment) Rules 1993 (S.I. 1993/516)
 Common Agricultural Policy (Wine) Regulations 1993 (S.I. 1993/517)
 Social Security Benefits (Miscellaneous Amendments) Regulations 1993 (S.I. 1993/518)
 Occupational and Personal Pension Schemes (Miscellaneous Amendments) Regulations 1993 (S.I. 1993/519)
 Local Authorities (Capital Finance) (Amendment) Regulations 1993 (S.I. 1993/520)
 National Health Service (General Medical and Pharmaceutical Services) (Scotland) Amendment Regulations 1993 (S.I. 1993/521)
 National Health Service (Charges for Drugs and Appliances) (Scotland) Amendment Regulations 1993 (S.I. 1993/522)
 National Health Service (Dental Services) (Miscellaneous Amendments) (Scotland) Regulations 1993 (S.I. 1993/523)
 National Health Service (Optical Charges and Payments) (Scotland) Amendment Regulations 1993 (S.I. 1993/524)
 Education (Fees and Awards) (Scotland) Amendment Regulations 1993 (S.I. 1993/525)
 Council Tax (Dwellings) (Scotland) Regulations 1993 (S.I. 1993/526)
 Council Tax (Transitional Reduction Scheme) (Scotland) Amendment (No.2) Regulations 1993 (S.I. 1993/527)
 Legal Aid in Contempt of Court Proceedings (Scotland) Amendment Regulations 1993 (S.I. 1993/528)
 Legal Aid in Contempt of Court Proceedings (Scotland) (Fees) Amendment Regulations 1993 (S.I. 1993/529)
 Criminal Legal Aid (Scotland) (Fees) Amendment Regulations 1993 (S.I. 1993/530)
 Civil Legal Aid (Scotland) (Fees) Amendment Regulations 1993 (S.I. 1993/531)
 Criminal Legal Aid (Scotland) Amendment Regulations 1993 (S.I. 1993/532)
 Advice and Assistance (Scotland) Amendment Regulations 1993 (S.I. 1993/533)
 Legal Aid (Scotland) (Children) Amendment Regulations 1993 (S.I. 1993/534)
 Civil Legal Aid (Scotland) Amendment Regulations 1993 (S.I. 1993/535)
 Misuse of Drugs (Licence Fees) (Amendment) Regulations 1993 (S.I. 1993/539)
 National Health Service (General Medical Services) Amendment Regulations 1993 (S.I. 1993/540)
 Statistics of Trade (Customs and Excise) (Amendment) Regulations 1993 (S.I. 1993/541)
 Non-Domestic Rating (Definition of Domestic Property) Order 1993 (S.I. 1993/542)
 Education (Teachers) Regulations 1993 (S.I. 1993/543)
 Non-Domestic Rating (Miscellaneous Provisions) (No. 2) (Amendment) Regulations 1993 (S.I. 1993/544)
 Local Authorities (Members' Allowances) (Amendment) Regulations 1993 (S.I. 1993/545)
 Building Societies (General Charge and Fees) Regulations 1993 (S.I. 1993/546)
 Friendly Societies (General Charge and Fees) Regulations 1993 (S.I. 1993/547)
 Industrial and Provident Societies (Credit Unions) (Amendment of Fees) Regulations 1993 (S.I. 1993/548)
 Industrial and Provident Societies (Amendment of Fees) Regulations 1993 (S.I. 1993/549)
 Removal, Storage and Disposal of Vehicles (Prescribed Sums and Charges etc.) (Amendment) Regulations 1993 (S.I. 1993/550)
 Housing Renovation etc. Grants (Reduction of Grant) (Amendment) Regulations 1993 (S.I. 1993/551)
 Housing Renovation etc. Grants (Prescribed Forms and Particulars) (Amendment) Regulations 1993 (S.I. 1993/552)
 Housing Renovation etc. Grants (Grant Limit) Order 1993 (S.I. 1993/553)
 Assistance for Minor Works to Dwellings (Amendment) Regulations 1993 (S.I. 1993/554)
 Academic Awards and Distinctions (Glasgow Caledonian University) (Scotland) Order of Council 1993 (S.I. 1993/555)
 Glasgow Caledonian University (Scotland) Order of Council 1993 (S.I. 1993/556)
 Napier University (Scotland) Order of Council 1993 (S.I. 1993/557)
 University of Paisley (Scotland) Order of Council 1993 (S.I. 1993/558)
 Further and Higher Education Act 1992 (Consequential Amendments) Regulations 1993 (S.I. 1993/559)
 Further and Higher Education Act 1992 (Consequential Amendments) Order 1993 (S.I. 1993/560)
 Taxes (Relief for Gifts) (Designated Educational Establishments) (Amendment) Regulations 1993 (S.I. 1993/561)
 Education (Designated Institutions in Further Education) (No. 2) Order 1993 (S.I. 1993/562)
 Education (Designated Institutions in Further and Higher Education) (Interpretation) Order 1993 (S.I. 1993/563)
 Judgment Debts (Rate of Interest) Order 1993 (S.I. 1993/564)
 Civil Legal Aid (General) (Amendment) Regulations 1993 (S.I. 1993/565)
 Controlled Waste (Amendment) Regulations 1993 (S.I. 1993/566)
 National Health Service (Fund-holding Practices) Regulations 1993 (S.I. 1993/567)
 Education (Grant-maintained Schools) (Finance) Regulations 1993 (S.I. 1993/568)
 Education (Grants) (Travellers and Displaced Persons) Regulations 1993 (S.I. 1993/569)
 Isles of Scilly (Community Care) Order 1993 (S.I. 1993/570)
 National Health Service (Determination of Regions) Amendment Order 1993 (S.I. 1993/571)
 National Health Service (District Health Authorities) Order 1993 (S.I. 1993/572)
 Regional and District Health Authorities (Membership and Procedure) Amendment Regulations 1993 (S.I. 1993/573)
 National Health Service (Determination of Districts) Order 1993 (S.I. 1993/574)
 Local Government Finance Act 1992 (Commencement No. 8 and Transitional Provisions) Order 1993 (S.I. 1993/575)
 Local Government Finance (Consequential Amendments) (Scotland) Order 1993 (S.I. 1993/576)
 Scottish Council for Postgraduate Medical and Dental Education Order 1993 (S.I. 1993/577)
 Qualifications of Directors of Social Work (Scotland) Amendment Regulations 1993 (S.I. 1993/578)
 City of Glasgow and Monklands Districts (Bargeddie) Boundaries Amendment Order 1993 (S.I. 1993/579)
 Stirling and Clackmannan Districts (Blackgrange and Blairlogie House) Boundaries Amendment Order 1993 (S.I. 1993/580)
 Housing (Change of Landlord) (Payment of Disposal Cost by Instalments) (Amendment) Regulations 1993 (S.I. 1993/581)
 Residential Accommodation (Determination of District Health Authority) (Amendment) Regulations 1993 (S.I. 1993/582)
 Social Security (Contributions) Amendment (No. 4) Regulations 1993 (S.I. 1993/583)
 Child Support (Northern Ireland Reciprocal Arrangements) Regulations 1993 (S.I. 1993/584)
 National Blood Authority (Establishment and Constitution) Order 1993 (S.I. 1993/585)
 National Blood Authority Regulations 1993 (S.I. 1993/586)
 Central Blood Laboratories Authority (Revocation) Order 1993 (S.I. 1993/587)
 Nurses, Midwives and Health Visitors Act 1992 (Commencement No. 1) Order 1993 (S.I. 1993/588)
 Registration of Births, Deaths and Marriages (Fees) (Amendment) (No. 2) Order 1993 (S.I. 1993/589)
 United Kingdom Central Council for Nursing, Midwifery and Health Visiting (Term of Office of Members) Order 1993 (S.I. 1993/590)
 Recovery of Maintenance (United States of America) Order 1993 (S.I. 1993/591)
 Social Security (Northern Ireland) Order 1993 (S.I. 1993/592)
 Reciprocal Enforcement of Maintenance Orders (Hague Convention Countries) Order 1993 (S.I. 1993/593)
 Reciprocal Enforcement of Maintenance Orders (Republic of Ireland) Order 1993 (S.I. 1993/594)
 European Communities (Designation) Order 1993 (S.I. 1993/595)
 Veterinary Surgeons Qualifications (EEC Recognition) (Amendment) Order 1993 (S.I. 1993/596)
 Home Guard (Amendment) Order 1993 (S.I. 1993/597)
 Naval, Military and Air Forces etc. (Disablement and Death) Service Pensions Amendment Order 1993 (S.I. 1993/598)
 Continental Shelf (Designation of Areas) Order 1993 (S.I. 1993/599)
 Appropriation (Northern Ireland) Order 1993 (S.I. 1993/600)

601-700
 Insurance (Fees) Regulations 1993 (S.I. 1993/601)
 Insolvency (Amendment) Rules 1993 (S.I. 1993/602)
 Civil Jurisdiction and Judgments Act 1982 (Amendment) Order 1993 (S.I. 1993/603)
 Civil Jurisdiction and Judgments (Authentic Instruments and Court Settlements) Order 1993 (S.I. 1993/604)
 Maximum Number of Judges Order 1993 (S.I. 1993/605)
 Maximum Number of Judges (Northern Ireland) Order 1993 (S.I. 1993/606)
 Air Navigation (Fourth Amendment) Order 1993 (S.I. 1993/607)
 National Health Service (Travelling Expenses and Remission of Charges) Amendment Regulations 1993 (S.I. 1993/608)
 Further Education (Attribution of Surpluses and Deficits) Regulations 1993 (S.I. 1993/609)
 Veterinary Surgeons and Veterinary Practitioners (Registration) (Amendment) Regulations Order of Council 1993 (S.I. 1993/610)
 Education (Welsh Agricultural College Higher Education Corporation) (Designated Staff) Order 1993 (S.I. 1993/611)
 Education (Further Education Corporations) (Designated Staff) (Wales) Order 1993 (S.I. 1993/612)
 Local Government Finance (Payments) (Welsh Authorities) Regulations 1993 (S.I. 1993/613)
 National Board for Nursing, Midwifery and Health Visiting for Wales (Constitution and Administration) Order 1993 (S.I. 1993/614)
 Valuation and Community Charge Tribunals (Amendment) (No. 2) Regulations 1993 (S.I. 1993/615)
 Local Government Finance (Repeals, Savings and Consequential Amendments) Order 1993 (S.I. 1993/616)
 Magistrates' Courts (Reciprocal Enforcement of Maintenance Orders) (Miscellaneous Amendments) Rules 1993 (S.I. 1993/617)
 Maintenance Orders (Reciprocal Enforcement) Act 1992 (Commencement) Order 1993 (S.I. 1993/618)
 Public Trustee (Fees) (Amendment) Order 1993 (S.I. 1993/619)
 Child Maintenance (Written Agreements) Order 1993 (S.I. 1993/620)
 Children (Admissibility of Hearsay Evidence) Order 1993 (S.I. 1993/621)
 High Court (Distribution of Business) Order 1993 (S.I. 1993/622)
 Maintenance Orders (Backdating) Order 1993 (S.I. 1993/623)
 Children (Allocation of Proceedings) (Amendment) Order 1993 (S.I. 1993/624)
 Education (Listed Bodies) Order 1993 (S.I. 1993/625)
 Education (Recognised Bodies) Order 1993 (S.I. 1993/626)
 Family Proceedings Courts (Child Support Act 1991) Rules 1993 (S.I. 1993/627)
 Education (Queen Elizabeth Atherstone Further Education Corporation) (Dissolution) Order 1993 (S.I. 1993/628)
 National Board for Nursing, Midwifery and Health Visiting for England (Constitution and Administration) Order 1993 (S.I. 1993/629)
 Motor Vehicles (Type Approval and Approval Marks) (Fees) Regulations 1993 (S.I. 1993/630)
 A65 Trunk Road (Hellifield and Long Preston Bypass and Slip Roads) Order 1993 (S.I. 1993/631)
 A65 Trunk Road (Bigholmes Lane to Switchers) (Detrunking) Order 1993 (S.I. 1993/632)
 National Board for Nursing, Midwifery and Health Visiting for Scotland Order 1993 (S.I. 1993/637)
 Lothian and Central Regions and West Lothian and Falkirk Districts (Mannerston/Cauldcoats Holdings and M9 Motorway) Boundaries Amendment Order 1993 (S.I. 1993/638)
 Dunfermline and Kirkcaldy Districts (Mossmorran) Boundaries Amendment Order 1993 (S.I. 1993/639)
 Dumfries and Galloway and Strathclyde Regions and Cumnock and Doon Valley and Stewartry Districts (Loch Doon) Boundaries Amendment Order 1993 (S.I. 1993/640)
 Law Reform (Miscellaneous Provisions) (Scotland) Act 1990 (Commencement No. 11) Order 1993 (S.I. 1993/641)
 National Health Service (Travelling Expenses and Remission of Charges) (Scotland) Amendment Regulations 1993 (S.I. 1993/642)
 Glasgow Polytechnic and The Queen's College, Glasgow (Closure) (Scotland) Order 1993 (S.I. 1993/643)
 Local Authorities Etc. (Allowances) (Scotland) Amendment Regulations 1993 (S.I. 1993/644)
 Assured Tenancies (Rent Information) (Scotland) Amendment Order 1993 (S.I. 1993/645)
 Rent Officers (Additional Functions) (Scotland) Amendment Order 1993 (S.I. 1993/646)
 Rent Regulation (Forms and Information etc.) (Scotland) Amendment Regulations 1993 (S.I. 1993/647)
 Assured Tenancies (Forms) (Scotland) Amendment Regulations 1993 (S.I. 1993/648)
 Assured Tenancies (Rent Book) (Scotland) Amendment Regulations 1993 (S.I. 1993/649)
 Social Security (Payments on account, Overpayments and Recovery) Amendment Regulations 1993 (S.I. 1993/650)
 Local Government Finance (Housing) (Consequential Amendments) Order 1993 (S.I. 1993/651)
 Rent Officers (Additional Functions) (Amendment) Order 1993 (S.I. 1993/652)
 Rent Assessment Committees (England and Wales) (Amendment) Regulations 1993 (S.I. 1993/653)
 Assured Tenancies and Agricultural Occupancies (Forms) (Amendment) Regulations 1993 (S.I. 1993/654)
 Rent Act 1977 (Forms etc.) (Amendment) Regulations 1993 (S.I. 1993/655)
 Rent Book (Forms of Notice) (Amendment) Regulations 1993 (S.I. 1993/656)
 Assured Tenancies and Agricultural Occupancies (Rent Information) (Amendment) Order 1993 (S.I. 1993/657)
 Local Government Finance (Housing) (Consequential Amendments) (Scotland) Order 1993 (S.I. 1993/658)
 Rent Assessment Committees (Scotland) (Consequential Amendments) Regulations 1993 (S.I. 1993/659)
 Child Support (Amendments to Primary Legislation) (Scotland) Order 1993 (S.I. 1993/660)
 A66 Trunk Road (Stainmore-Banks Gate De-Trunking) Order 1993 (S.I. 1993/661)
 A66 Trunk Road (Stainmore-Banks Gate Improvement) Order 1993 (S.I. 1993/662)
 County of Wiltshire (Electoral Arrangements) Order 1993 (S.I. 1993/679)
 M621 To M1 Link Roads (and Connecting Roads) Scheme 1993 (S.I. 1993/681)
 Nuclear Installations (Application of Security Provisions) Order 1993 (S.I. 1993/687)
 Council Tax Benefit (General) Amendment Regulations 1993 (S.I. 1993/688)
 Council Tax Benefit (Permitted Total) Order 1993 (S.I. 1993/689)
 Adoption (Designation of Overseas Adoptions) (Variation) Order 1993 (S.I. 1993/690)
 Cheshire, Lancashire and Merseyside (County and Metropolitan Borough Boundaries) Order 1993 (S.I. 1993/691)
 War Pensions (Miscellaneous Amendments) Order 1993 (S.I. 1993/692)
 Guy's and St Thomas' National Health Service Trust (Establishment) Order 1993 (S.I. 1993/693)
 Lewisham Hospital National Health Service Trust (Establishment) Order 1993 (S.I. 1993/694)
 St Thomas' Hospital National Health Service Trust Dissolution Order 1993 (S.I. 1993/695)
 Guy's and Lewisham National Health Service Trust Dissolution Order 1993 (S.I. 1993/696)
 Barts National Health Service Trust Dissolution Order 1993 (S.I. 1993/697)
 King's Healthcare National Health Service Trust (Establishment) Amendment Order 1993 (S.I. 1993/698)

701-800
 Register of County Court Judgments (Amendment) Regulations 1993 (S.I. 1993/710)
 County Court (Amendment) Rules 1993 (S.I. 1993/711)
 County Court (Forms)(Amendment) Rules 1993 (S.I. 1993/712)
 North Staffordshire Hospital Centre National Health Service Trust (Change of Name) Order 1993 (S.I. 1993/713)
 Housing Renovation etc. Grants (Prescribed Forms and Particulars) (Welsh Forms and Particulars) (Amendment) Regulations 1993 (S.I. 1993/715)
 Combined Probation Areas (Amendment) (No. 2) Order 1993 (S.I. 1993/716)
 A4 and A46 Trunk Roads (Batheaston/Swainswick Bypass and Slip Roads) Order 1993 (S.I. 1993/717)
 A4 and A46 Trunk Roads (Batheaston/Swainswick Bypass and Slip Roads) (Detrunking) Order 1993 (S.I. 1993/718)
 Export of Goods (Control) (Bosnia-Herzegovina) (ECSC) Order 1993 (S.I. 1993/719)
 Police (Common Police Services) (Scotland) Order 1993 (S.I. 1993/720)
 Grant for Bail Services (Scotland) Order 1993 (S.I. 1993/721)
 Social Security (Industrial Injuries) (Dependency) (Permitted Earnings Limits) Order 1993 (S.I. 1993/722)
 Social Security Benefits Up-rating Regulations 1993 (S.I. 1993/723)
 Income Tax (Sub-contractors in the Construction Industry) (Amendment) Regulations 1993 (S.I. 1993/724)
 Income Tax (Employments) (No. 24) Regulations 1993 (S.I. 1993/725)
 Income Tax (Employments) (No. 25) Regulations 1993 (S.I. 1993/726)
 Income Tax (Employments) (No. 26) Regulations 1993 (S.I. 1993/727)
 Rules of the Air (Second Amendment) Regulations 1993 (S.I. 1993/728)
 Derbyshire, Nottinghamshire and South Yorkshire (County and District Boundaries) Order 1993 (S.I. 1993/729)
 Income Tax (Sub-contractors in the Construction Industry) Regulations 1993 (S.I. 1993/743)
 Income Tax (Employments) Regulations 1993 (S.I. 1993/744)
 Health and Safety (Miscellaneous Modifications) Regulations 1993 (S.I. 1993/745)
 Access to Health Records (Control of Access) Regulations 1993 (S.I. 1993/746)
 Prevention of Terrorism (Temporary Provisions) Act 1989 (Continuance) Order 1993 (S.I. 1993/747)
 Combined Probation Areas (Northumbria) Order 1993 (S.I. 1993/748)
 Combined Probation Areas (Staffordshire) Order 1993 (S.I. 1993/749)
 Combined Probation Areas (Surrey) Order 1993 (S.I. 1993/750)
 Medicines Control Agency Trading Fund Order 1993 (S.I. 1993/751)
 Bingo Duty (Exemptions) Order 1993 (S.I. 1993/752)
 Finance Act 1989, section 158(1) and (2), (Appointed Days) Order 1993 (S.I. 1993/753)
 Finance Act 1989, section 178(1), (Appointed Day) Order 1993 (S.I. 1993/754)
 Income Tax (Indexation) Order 1993 (S.I. 1993/755)
 Personal Equity Plan (Amendment) Regulations 1993 (S.I. 1993/756)
 Retirement Benefits Schemes (Indexation of Earnings Cap) Order 1993 (S.I. 1993/757)
 Taxes (Interest Rate) (Amendment No. 2) Regulations 1993 (S.I. 1993/758)
 Inheritance Tax (Indexation) Order 1993 (S.I. 1993/759)
 Capital Gains Tax (Annual Exempt Amount) Order 1993 (S.I. 1993/760)
 Value Added Tax (Accounting and Records) (Amendment) Regulations 1993 (S.I. 1993/761)
 Value Added Tax (Cash Accounting) (Amendment) Regulations 1993 (S.I. 1993/762)
 Value Added Tax (Education) Order 1993 (S.I. 1993/763)
 Value Added Tax (General) (Amendment) (No. 2) Regulations 1993 (S.I. 1993/764)
 Value Added Tax (Increase of Consideration for Fuel) Order 1993 (S.I. 1993/765)
 Value Added Tax (Increase of Registration Limits) Order 1993 (S.I. 1993/766)
 Value Added Tax (Protective Boots and Helmets) Order 1993 (S.I. 1993/767)
 Registered Establishments (Fees) (Scotland) Order 1993 (S.I. 1993/768)
 Act of Sederunt (Interest in Sheriff Court Decrees and Extracts) 1993 (S.I. 1993/769)
 Act of Sederunt (Rules of the Court of Session Amendment) (Interest in Decrees and Extracts) 1993 (S.I. 1993/770)
 Water Undertakers (Rateable Values) (Amendment) Order 1993 (S.I. 1993/772)
 Council Tax (Administration and Enforcement) (Amendment) (No. 2) Regulations 1993 (S.I. 1993/773)
 Non-Domestic Rating (Collection and Enforcement) (Amendment and Miscellaneous Provision) Regulations 1993 (S.I. 1993/774)
 Community Charges (Administration and Enforcement) (Amendment) Regulations 1993 (S.I. 1993/775)
 Pensions Increase (Review) Order 1993 (S.I. 1993/779)
 British Railways (Penalty Fares) Act 1989 (Activating No. 9) Order 1993 (S.I. 1993/780)
 British Railways (Penalty Fares) Act 1989 (Activating No. 10) Order 1993 (S.I. 1993/781)
 Premium Savings Bonds (Amendment) Regulations 1993 (S.I. 1993/782)
 National Savings Stock Register (Amendment) Regulations 1993 (S.I. 1993/783)
 Redundancy Payments (Local Government) (Modification) (Amendment) Order 1993 (S.I. 1993/784)
 Child Support Act 1991 (Consequential Amendments) Order 1993 (S.I. 1993/785)
 Chester Port Health Authority (Revocation)Order 1993 (S.I. 1993/786)
 Civil Legal Aid (Assessment of Resources) (Amendment) Regulations 1993 (S.I. 1993/788)
 Legal Aid in Criminal and Care Proceedings (General) (Amendment) Regulations 1993 (S.I. 1993/789)
 Legal Advice and Assistance (Amendment) Regulations 1993 (S.I. 1993/790)
 Measuring Instruments (EEC Requirements) (Fees) Regulations 1993 (S.I. 1993/798)
 Public Lending Right (Increase of Limit) Order 1993 (S.I. 1993/799)
 South Eastern Combined Fire Area Administration (Amendment) (No. 2) Scheme Order 1993 (S.I. 1993/800)

801-900
 Greater London and Kent (County Boundaries) (Variation) Order 1993 (S.I. 1993/805)
 Pensions Increase (Civil Service Early Retirement Pension Scheme 1992) Regulations 1993 (S.I. 1993/806)
 Injuries in War (Shore Employments) Compensation (Amendment) Scheme 1992 S.I. 1993/807)
 Devon Ambulance Service National Health Service Trust Dissolution Order 1993 (S.I. 1993/809)
 Cornwall Community Healthcare National Health Service Trust Dissolution Order 1993 (S.I. 1993/810)
 Walsgrave Hospitals National Health Service Trust (Establishment) Order 1993 (S.I. 1993/811)
 Walsgrave Hospital National Health Service Trust Dissolution Order 1993 (S.I. 1993/812)
 Cornwall Healthcare National Health Service Trust (Establishment) Order 1993 (S.I. 1993/813)
 Westcountry Ambulance Services National Health Service Trust (Establishment) Order 1993 (S.I. 1993/814)
 Reconstitution of the Romney Marsh Levels Internal Drainage Board Order 1993 (S.I. 1993/815)
 Reconstitution of the Finningley Internal Drainage Board Order 1993 (S.I. 1993/816)
 Reconstitution of the River Stour (Kent) Internal Drainage Board S.I. 1993/817)
 Civil Legal Aid (Scotland) Amendment (No.2) Regulations 1993 (S.I. 1993/818)
 Advice and Assistance (Scotland) Amendment (No.2) Regulations 1993 (S.I. 1993/819)
 Harefield Hospital National Health Service Trust (Transfer of Trust Property) Order 1993 (S.I. 1993/820)
 Social Security (Contributions) Amendment (No. 5) Regulations 1993 (S.I. 1993/821)
 Hinchingbrooke Health Care National Health Service Trust Dissolution Order 1993 (S.I. 1993/822)
 Hinchingbrooke Health Care National Health Service Trust (Establishment) Order 1993 (S.I. 1993/823)
 Reconstitution of the Upper Medway Internal Drainage Board Order 1993 (S.I. 1993/824)
 Reconstitution of the Lower Medway Internal Drainage Board Order 1993 (S.I. 1993/825)
 National Rivers Authority (Severn-Trent Region) (Reconstitution of the Newark Area Internal Drainage Board) Order 1993 (S.I. 1993/829)
 Non-Domestic Rates (No.2) (Scotland) Order 1993 (S.I. 1993/830)
 Medicines (Applications for Manufacturer's and Wholesale Dealer's Licences) Amendment Regulations 1993 (S.I. 1993/832)
 Medicines (Standard Provisions for Licences and Certificates) Amendment Regulations 1993 (S.I. 1993/833)
 Medicines Act 1968 (Amendment) Regulations 1993 (S.I. 1993/834)
 Education (Individual Pupils' Achievements) (Information) (Wales) Regulations 1993 (S.I. 1993/835)
 Banking Act 1987 (Disclosure of Information) (Specified Persons) (Revocation) Order 1993 (S.I. 1993/836)
 Education (Grant-maintained Schools) (Finance) (Amendment) Regulations 1993 (S.I. 1993/843)
 Social Security (Miscellaneous Provisions) Amendment Regulations 1993 (S.I. 1993/846)
 The Official Secrets Act 1989 (Prescription) (Amendment) Order 1993 (S.I. 1993/847)
 Local Government (Direct Service Organisations) (Competition) Regulations 1993 (S.I. 1993/848)
 Calderdale and Kirklees (Metropolitan Borough Boundaries) Order 1993 (S.I. 1993/850)
 Bolton and Salford (City and Metropolitan Borough Boundaries) Order 1993 (S.I. 1993/851)
 Value Added Tax (General) (Amendment) (No.3) Regulations 1993 (S.I. 1993/856)
 Social Security (Industrial Injuries and Adjudication) Regulations 1993 (S.I. 1993/861)
 Social Security (Industrial Injuries) (Prescribed Diseases) Amendment Regulations 1993 (S.I. 1993/862)
 Official Secrets (Prohibited Places) (Amendment) Order 1993 S.I. 1993/863)
 Devon and Cornwall Police (Amalgamation) (Amendment) Order 1993 (S.I. 1993/864)
 West Mercia Police (Amalgamation) (Amendment) Order 1993 (S.I. 1993/865)
 Sussex Police (Amalgamation) (Amendment) Order 1993 (S.I. 1993/866)
 Avon and Somerset Police (Amalgamation) (Amendment) Order 1993 (S.I. 1993/867)
 Thames Valley Police (Amalgamation) (Amendment) Order 1993 (S.I. 1993/868)
 South Wales Police (Amalgamation) (Amendment) Order 1993 (S.I. 1993/869)
 Education (Designated Institutions in Further and Higher Education) (Interpretation) (Amendment) Order 1993 (S.I. 1993/870)
 A13 Trunk Road (Newham, Barking and Dagenham, and Havering) (Speed Limits) Order 1988 (Variation) Order 1993 (S.I. 1993/871)
 Western Isles Islands Council (Lochmaddy) Water Order 1993 (S.I. 1993/872)
 Oil Related and Petrochemical Plants (Rateable Values) (Scotland) Order 1993 (S.I. 1993/873)
 Electricity Generators (Rateable Values) (Scotland) Order 1993 (S.I. 1993/874)
 Scottish Hydro-Electric plc. (Rateable Values) (Scotland) Order 1993 (S.I. 1993/875)
 Industrial and Freight Transport (Rateable Values) (Scotland) Order 1993 (S.I. 1993/876)
 Scottish Nuclear Limited (Rateable Values) (Scotland) Order 1993 (S.I. 1993/877)
 Scottish Power plc. (Rateable Values) (Scotland) Order 1993 (S.I. 1993/878)
 British Gas plc. (Rateable Values) (Scotland) Order 1993 (S.I. 1993/879)
 British Railways Board (Rateable Values) (Scotland) Order 1993 (S.I. 1993/880)
 British Telecommunications plc. (Rateable Values) (Scotland) Order 1993 (S.I. 1993/881)
 Glasgow Underground (Rateable Values) (Scotland) Order 1993 (S.I. 1993/882)
 Lochaber Power Company (Rateable Values) (Scotland) Order 1993 (S.I. 1993/883)
 Mercury Communications Ltd. (Rateable Values) (Scotland) Order 1993 (S.I. 1993/884)
 Mines and Quarries (Rateable Values) (Scotland) Order 1993 (S.I. 1993/885)
 Water Undertakings (Rateable Values) (Scotland) Order 1993 (S.I. 1993/886)
 National Health Service Act 1977 (Composition of Medical Practices Committee) Modification Order 1993 (S.I. 1993/887)
 A1 Trunk Road (Islington) Red Route Traffic Order 1993 (S.I. 1993/891)
 United Kingdom Central Council for Nursing, Midwifery and Health Visiting (Legal Assessors) (Amendment) Order 1993 (S.I. 1993/892)
 Nurses, Midwives and Health Visitors (Professional Conduct) Rules 1993 Approval Order 1993 (S.I. 1993/893)
 Non-Domestic Rating (Collection and Enforcement) (Amendment and Miscellaneous Provision) (No. 2) Regulations 1993 (S.I. 1993/894)
 A1 Trunk Road (Islington) (Bus Lanes) Red Route Traffic Order 1993 (S.I. 1993/895)
 A1 Trunk Road (Haringey) Red Route Traffic Order 1993 (S.I. 1993/896)
 A1 Trunk Road (Haringey) (Bus Lanes) Red Route Traffic Order 1993 (S.I. 1993/897)
 Act of Sederunt (Fees of Solicitors in the Sheriff Court) (Amendment) 1993 (S.I. 1993/898)
 Act of Sederunt (Rules of the Court of Session Amendment) (Register of Insolvencies) 1993 (S.I. 1993/899)
 Act of Sederunt (Rules of the Court of Session Amendment No. 2) (Fees of Solicitors) 1993 (S.I. 1993/900)

901-1000
 Further Education (Exclusion of Land from Transfer) Order 1993 (S.I. 1993/901)
 Greater Manchester and Lancashire (County and Metropolitan Borough Boundaries) Order 1993 (S.I. 1993/902)
 Dyfed-Powys Police (Amalgamation) (Amendment) Order 1993 (S.I. 1993/909)
 National Rivers Authority (Anglian Region) (Reconstitution of the Witham Third District Internal Drainage Board) Order 1993 (S.I. 1993/910)
 Plymouth Development Corporation (Area and Constitution) Order 1993 (S.I. 1993/911)
 Electricity (Restrictive Trade Practices Act 1976) (Exemption) Order 1993 (S.I. 1993/912)
 Child Support (Miscellaneous Amendments) Regulations 1993 (S.I. 1993/913)
 Act of Sederunt (Child Support Act 1991) (Amendment of Ordinary Cause and Summary Cause Rules) 1993 (S.I. 1993/919)
 Act of Sederunt (Child Support Rules) 1993 (S.I. 1993/920)
 Act of Sederunt (Bankruptcy Rules) 1993 (S.I. 1993/921)
 Land Registration (Scotland) Act 1979 (Commencement No. 7) Order 1993 (S.I. 1993/922)
 Dairy Produce Quotas Regulations 1993 (S.I. 1993/923)
 Education (Dissolution of the Council for National Academic Awards) Order 1993 (S.I. 1993/924)
 Child Support (Maintenance Assessments and Special Cases) Amendment Regulations 1993 (S.I. 1993/925)
 Greater Manchester and Lancashire (County and District Boundaries) Order 1993 (S.I. 1993/926)
 Secure Tenancies (Designated Courses) (Amendment) Regulations 1993 (S.I. 1993/931)
 Friendly Societies Act 1992 (Transitional and Consequential Provisions and Savings) Regulations 1993 (S.I. 1993/932)
 Finance Act 1991, section 58, (Commencement No. 3) Regulations 1993 (S.I. 1993/933)
 Legal Aid in Criminal and Care Proceedings (Costs) (Amendment) Regulations 1993 (S.I. 1993/934)
 Housing Benefit and Community Charge Benefit (Subsidy) (No. 2) Order 1993 (S.I. 1993/935)
 Certification Officer (Amendment of Fees) Regulations 1993 (S.I. 1993/936)
 Further Education (Exclusion of Land from Transfer) (No. 2) Order 1993 (S.I. 1993/937)
 Land Registry Trading Fund Order 1993 (S.I. 1993/938)
 Land Registration (Determination of Costs) Order 1993 (S.I. 1993/939)
 Local Government Administration (Matters Subject to Investigation) Order 1993 (S.I. 1993/940)
 Local Elections (Variation of Limits of Candidates' Election Expenses) (Northern Ireland) Order 1993 (S.I. 1993/941)
 Copyright (Application to Other Countries) Order 1993 (S.I. 1993/942)
 Performances (Reciprocal Protection) (Convention Countries) Order 1993 (S.I. 1993/943)
 European Communities (Definition of Treaties) (International Railway Tariffs Agreements) Order 1993 (S.I. 1993/944)
 Insurance Companies (Accounts and Statements) (Amendment) Regulations 1993 (S.I. 1993/946)
 Patents (Supplementary Protection Certificate for Medicinal Products) (Amendment) Rules 1993 (S.I. 1993/947)
 Chessington Computer Centre Trading Fund Order 1993 (S.I. 1993/948)
 Income Tax (Interest Relief) (Qualifying Lenders) Order 1993 (S.I. 1993/949)
 Capital Gains Tax (Gilt-edged Securities) Order 1993 (S.I. 1993/950)
 Banking Act 1987 (Exempt Persons) Order 1993 (S.I. 1993/953)
 Financial Services Act 1986 (Overseas Investment Exchanges and Overseas Clearing Houses) (Periodical Fees) Regulations 1993 (S.I. 1993/954)
 City of Glasgow and Monklands Districts (Bargeddie) Boundaries Amendment (No. 2) Order 1993 (S.I. 1993/960)
 Child Support Appeals (Jurisdiction of Courts) Order 1993 (S.I. 1993/961)
 Education (School Teachers' Pay and Conditions) Order 1993 (S.I. 1993/962)
 Social Security Benefits (Miscellaneous Amendments) (No. 2) Regulations 1993 (S.I. 1993/963)
 National Assistance (Assessment of Resources) (Amendment) Regulations 1993 (S.I. 1993/964)
 Child Benefit and Social Security (Miscellaneous Amendments) Regulations 1993 (S.I. 1993/965)
 Child Support Act 1991 (Commencement No. 3 and Transitional Provisions) Amendment Order 1993 (S.I. 1993/966)
 Gaming Act (Variation of Monetary Limits) Order 1993 (S.I. 1993/967)
 Gaming Clubs (Hours and Charges) (Amendment) Regulations 1993 (S.I. 1993/968)
 Legal Aid (Scotland) Act 1986 Amendment Regulations 1993 (S.I. 1993/969)
 Civil Legal Aid (Financial Conditions and Contributions) (Scotland) Regulations 1993 (S.I. 1993/970)
 Advice and Assistance (Financial Conditions) (Scotland) Regulations 1993 (S.I. 1993/971)
 Advice and Assistance (Assistance by Way of Representation) (Scotland) Amendment Regulations 1993 (S.I. 1993/972)
 Advice and Assistance (Scotland) (Prospective Cost) Amendment Regulations 1993 (S.I. 1993/973)
 Education (Grants for Further Training of Teachers and Educational Psychologists Etc.) (Scotland) Regulations 1993 (S.I. 1993/974)
 Road Traffic Act 1991 (Commencement No. 6) Order 1993 (S.I. 1993/975)
 Protection of Wrecks (Designation No. 1) Order 1993 (S.I. 1993/976)
 Banking Appeal Tribunal (Amendment) Regulations 1993 (S.I. 1993/982)
 Building Societies Appeal Tribunal (Amendment) Regulations 1993 (S.I. 1993/983)
 Building Societies (Prescribed Contracts) Order 1993 (S.I. 1993/984)
 Building Societies (Designation of Qualifying Bodies) Order 1993 (S.I. 1993/985)
 Sale of Registration Marks (Amendment) Regulations 1993 (S.I. 1993/986)
 Retention of Registration Marks Regulations 1993 (S.I. 1993/987)
 Retention of Registration Marks Regulations 1992 (Amendment) Regulations 1993 (S.I. 1993/988)
 Building Societies (Designation of Qualifying Bodies) (No. 2) Order 1993 (S.I. 1993/989)
 Animals, Meat and Meat Products (Examination for Residues and Maximum Residue Limits) (Amendment) Regulations 1993 (S.I. 1993/990)
 Tayside Region (Electoral Arrangements) Order 1993 (S.I. 1993/991)
 Dumfries and Galloway Region (Electoral Arrangements) Order 1993 (S.I. 1993/992)
 National Health Service (Appointment of Consultants) (Scotland) Regulations 1993 (S.I. 1993/994)
 Assured Tenancies (Exceptions) (Scotland) Amendment Regulations 1993 (S.I. 1993/995)
 Environmentally Sensitive Areas (Central Southern Uplands) Designation Order 1993 (S.I. 1993/996)
 Environmentally Sensitive Areas (Western Southern Uplands) Designation Order 1993 (S.I. 1993/997)
 Education (School Curriculum and Related Information) (Amendment) (Wales) Regulations 1993 (S.I. 1993/998)

1001-1100
 Export of Goods (Control) (Amendment) Order 1993 (S.I. 1993/1020)
 Foreign Satellite Service Proscription Order 1993 (S.I. 1993/1024)
 Social Security (Consequential Provisions) Act 1992 Appointed Day Order 1993 (S.I. 1993/1025)
 Cranfield Airport (Designation) (Detention and Sale of Aircraft) Order 1993 (S.I. 1993/1026)
 Weymouth and Portland Harbour Revision Order 1993 (S.I. 1993/1027)
 Town and Country Planning (General Permitted Development) (Scotland) Amendment Order 1993 (S.I. 1993/1036)
 Gaming Act (Variation of Monetary Limits) (Scotland) Order 1993 (S.I. 1993/1037)
 Town and Country Planning (Use Classes) (Scotland) Amendment Order 1993 (S.I. 1993/1038)
 Town and Country Planning (General S.I. 1993/1039)
 Gaming Clubs (Hours and Charges) (Scotland) Amendment Regulations 1993 (S.I. 1993/1040)
 Reconstitution of the Bedfordshire and River Ivel Internal Drainage Board Order 1993 (S.I. 1993/1041)
 Glan Conwy-Conwy Morfa Trunk Road (A547) (Previously known as and forming part of The Chester—Bangor Trunk Road (A55)) Detrunking Order 1993 (S.I. 1993/1057)
 International Finance Corporation (1991 General Capital Increase) Order 1993 (S.I. 1993/1059)
 Asian Development Bank (Fifth Replenishment of the Asian Development Fund and Second Regularized Replenishment of the Technical Assistance Special Fund) Order 1993 (S.I. 1993/1060)
 Banking Appeal Tribunal (Scottish Appeals) Amendment Regulations 1993 (S.I. 1993/1061)
 Financial Assistance for Environmental Purposes Order 1993 (S.I. 1993/1062)
 A43 Trunk Road (Silverstone Bypass and Slip Roads) Order 1993 (S.I. 1993/1063)
 A43 Trunk Road (Silverstone Bypass) (Detrunking) Order 1993 (S.I. 1993/1064)
 North Norfolk Action (Miscellaneous Provisions) Order 1993 (S.I. 1993/1065)
 Gipsy Encampments (Metropolitan District of Sefton) Order 1993 (S.I. 1993/1066)
 Airports Slot Allocation Regulations 1993 (S.I. 1993/1067)
 Oldham National Health Service Trust (Transfer of Trust Property) Order 1993 (S.I. 1993/1068)
 Cornwall and Isles of Scilly Mental Handicap National Health Service Trust (Change of Name) Order 1993 (S.I. 1993/1069)
 Merchant Shipping (Vessels in Commercial Use for Sport or Pleasure) Regulations 1993 (S.I. 1993/1072)
 Aviation Security (Air Cargo Agents) Regulations 1993 (S.I. 1993/1073)
 Vocational Training (Public Financial Assistance and Disentitlement to Tax Relief) (Amendment) Regulations 1993 (S.I. 1993/1074)
 Plymouth Development Corporation (Planning Functions) Order 1993 (S.I. 1993/1075)
 Social Security (Consequential Provisions) (Northern Ireland) Act 1992 Appointed Day Order 1993 (S.I. 1993/1079)
 Vocational Training (Tax Relief) (Amendment) Regulations 1993 (S.I. 1993/1082)
 Peak Rail Light Railway Order 1993 (S.I. 1993/1083)
 Dacorum and St Albans Community National Health Service Trust (Transfer of Trust Property) Order 1993 (S.I. 1993/1084)
 Rochdale Healthcare National Health Service Trust (Transfer of Trust Property) Order 1993 (S.I. 1993/1085)
 Horizon National Health Service Trust (Transfer of Trust Property) Order 1993 (S.I. 1993/1086)
 Bexley and Greenwich (London Borough Boundaries) Order 1993 (S.I. 1993/1091)
 Insurance Companies (Cancellation No. 2) Regulations 1993 (S.I. 1993/1092)
 London Cab Order 1993 (S.I. 1993/1093)
 Highland Region (Electoral Arrangements) Order 1993 (S.I. 1993/1094)
 Fife Region (Electoral Arrangements) Order 1993 (S.I. 1993/1095)
 Local Government Staff Commission (England) Order 1993 (S.I. 1993/1098)

1101-1200
 Welfare Food Amendment Regulations 1993 (S.I. 1993/1105)
 A630 Trunk Road (Rotherham) (Detrunking) Order 1993 (S.I. 1993/1107)
 Social Security (Claims and Payments) Amendment (No. 2) Regulations 1993 (S.I. 1993/1113)
 Local Fisheries Committees (Fees for Copy Byelaws) Order 1993 (S.I. 1993/1116)
 Legal Aid in Family Proceedings (Remuneration) (Amendment) Regulations 1993 (S.I. 1993/1117)
 Central and Fife Regions and Clackmannan and Dunfermline Districts (River Forth, Kilbagie Mill, Slack Cottage and River Black Devon) Boundaries Amendment Order 1993 (S.I. 1993/1118)
 Transport and Works Applications (Inland Waterways Procedure) Regulations 1993 (S.I. 1993/1119)
 Local Government Finance (Housing) (Consequential Amendments) (Amendment) Order 1993 (S.I. 1993/1120)
 Road Traffic (Training of Drivers of Vehicles Carrying Dangerous Goods) (Amendment) Regulations 1993 (S.I. 1993/1122)
 Value Added Tax (Education) (No. 2) Order 1993 (S.I. 1993/1124)
 Grampian Region (Electoral Arrangements) Order 1993 (S.I. 1993/1125)
 Moray Health Services National Health Service Trust (Appointment of Trustees) Order 1993 (S.I. 1993/1126)
 Royal Scottish National Hospital and Community National Health Service Trust (Appointment of Trustees) Order 1993 (S.I. 1993/1127)
 Royal Alexandra Hospital National Health Service Trust (Appointment of Trustees) Order 1993 (S.I. 1993/1128)
 Raigmore Hospital National Health Service Trust (Appointment of Trustees) Order 1993 (S.I. 1993/1129)
 Grampian Healthcare National Health Service Trust (Appointment of Trustees) Order 1993 (S.I. 1993/1130)
 Dundee Teaching Hospitals National Health Service Trust (Appointment of Trustees) Order 1993 (S.I. 1993/1131)
 Caithness and Sutherland National Health Service Trust (Appointment of Trustees) Order 1993 (S.I. 1993/1132)
 Southern General Hospital National Health Service Trust (Appointment of Trustees) Order 1993 (S.I. 1993/1133)
 Stirling Royal Infirmary National Health Service Trust (Appointment of Trustees) Order 1993 (S.I. 1993/1134)
 Victoria Infirmary National Health Service Trust (Appointment of Trustees) Order 1993 (S.I. 1993/1135)
 West Lothian National Health Service Trust (Appointment of Trustees) Order 1993 (S.I. 1993/1136)
 Yorkhill National Health Service Trust (Appointment of Trustees) Order 1993 (S.I. 1993/1137)
 North Ayrshire and Arran National Health Service Trust (Appointment of Trustees) Order 1993 (S.I. 1993/1138)
 Monklands and Bellshill Hospitals National Health Service Trust (Appointment of Trustees) Order 1993 (S.I. 1993/1139)
 Ayrshire and Arran Community Health Care National Health Service Trust (Appointment of Trustees) Order 1993 (S.I. 1993/1140)
 Essex and Greater London (County and London Borough Boundaries) Order 1993 (S.I. 1993/1141)
 Croydon, Lambeth and Southwark (London Borough Boundaries) Order 1993 (S.I. 1993/1147)
 Greater London and Surrey (County and London Borough Boundaries) Order 1993 (S.I. 1993/1148)
 Coast Protection (Variation of Excluded Waters) Regulations 1993 (S.I. 1993/1149)
 Income-related Benefits Schemes (Miscellaneous Amendments) (No. 2) Regulations 1993 (S.I. 1993/1150)
 Food Protection (Emergency Prohibitions) (Oil and Chemical Pollution of Fish) (No.2) (Partial Revocation) Order 1993 (S.I. 1993/1151)
 Finance Act 1991 (Commencement and Transitional Provisions) Order 1993 (S.I. 1993/1152)
 Water Byelaws (Milngavie Waterworks, Loch Katrine, Loch Arklet, Glen Finglas) Extension Order 1993 (S.I. 1993/1153)
 Control of Pollution (Exemption of Certain Discharges from Control) (Scotland) Variation Order 1993 (S.I. 1993/1154)
 Control of Pollution (Registers) (Scotland) Regulations 1993 (S.I. 1993/1155)
 Control of Pollution (Discharges by Islands Councils) (Scotland) Regulations 1993 (S.I. 1993/1156)
 Robert Gordon University (Scotland) Order of Council 1993 (S.I. 1993/1157)
 Pneumoconiosis etc. (Workers' Compensation) (Payment of Claims) (Amendment) Regulations 1993 (S.I. 1993/1158)
 Social Security Revaluation of Earnings Factors Order 1993 (S.I. 1993/1159)
 Emulsifiers and Stabilisers in Food (Amendment) Regulations 1993 (S.I. 1993/1161)
 National Rivers Authority (Anglian Region) (Reconstitution of the Skegness District Internal Drainage Board) Order 1993 (S.I. 1993/1174)
 Reconstitution of the Denge and Southbrooks Internal Drainage Board Order 1993 (S.I. 1993/1175)
 Civil Aviation (Navigation Services Charges) (Third Amendment) Regulations 1993 (S.I. 1993/1176)
 Undersized Lobsters Order 1993 (S.I. 1993/1178)
 PARLIAMENT S.I. 1993/1181)
 Magistrates' Courts (Miscellaneous Amendments) Rules 1993 (S.I. 1993/1183)
 British Wool (Guaranteed Prices) (Revocation) Order 1993 (S.I. 1993/1184)
 Friendly Societies Act 1992 (Commencement No. 5 and Savings) Order 1993 (S.I. 1993/1186)
 Friendly Societies Act 1992 (Consequential Provisions) (No. 2) Regulations 1993 (S.I. 1993/1187)
 Serbia and Montenegro (United Nations Sanctions) Order 1993 (S.I. 1993/1188)
 Export of Goods (Control) (Croatian and Bosnian Territories) Order 1993 (S.I. 1993/1189)
 Education (Schools) Act 1992 (Commencement No. 2 and Transitional Provision) Order 1993 (S.I. 1993/1190)
 Lothian Region (Electoral Arrangements) Order 1993 (S.I. 1993/1191)
 Injuries in War (Shore Employments) Compensation (Amendment) Scheme 1993 (S.I. 1993/1192)
 Electricity (Standards of Performance) Regulations 1993 (S.I. 1993/1193)
 Diseases of Animals (Approved Disinfectants) (Amendment) Order 1993 (S.I. 1993/1194)
 Serbia and Montenegro (United Nations Sanctions) (Dependent Territories) Order 1993 (S.I. 1993/1195)
 Sea Fish Licensing (Time at Sea) (Principles) Order 1993 (S.I. 1993/1196)
 Third Country Fishing (Enforcement) Order 1993 (S.I. 1993/1197)
 Police (Amendment) (No. 2) Regulations 1993 (S.I. 1993/1198)
 Lincolnshire County Council (Tattershall Bridge Reconstruction) Scheme 1991 Confirmation Instrument 1993 (S.I. 1993/1199)
 Export of Goods (Control) (Bosnia-Herzegovina) (ECSC) (Revocation) Order 1993 (S.I. 1993/1200)

1201-1300
 Scrabster Harbour Revision Order 1993 (S.I. 1993/1201)
 Road Traffic (Parking Adjudicators) (London) Regulations 1993 (S.I. 1993/1202)
 Lancashire and Merseyside (County Boundaries) Order 1993 (S.I. 1993/1206)
 Bromley, Croydon, Lambeth, Lewisham and Southwark (London Borough Boundaries) Order 1993 (S.I. 1993/1207)
 Greater London and Surrey (County and London Borough Boundaries) (No. 2) Order 1993 (S.I. 1993/1208)
 Medway Ports Authority (Dissolution) Order 1993 (S.I. 1993/1209)
 Environmentally Sensitive Areas (Ynys Môn) Designation Order 19930 S.I. 1993/1210)
 Environmentally Sensitive Areas (Radnor) Designation Order 1993 (S.I. 1993/1211)
 Cod (Irish Sea) (Prohibition of Fishing) Order 1993 (S.I. 1993/1212)
 Merchant Shipping (Local Passenger Vessels)(Masters' Licences and Hours, Manning and Training) Regulations 1993 (S.I. 1993/1213)
 Education (Student Loans) Regulations 1993 (S.I. 1993/1214)
Act of Sederunt (Solicitor's Right of Audience) 1993 (S.I. 1993/1215)
 Essex and Greater London (County and London Borough Boundaries) (No.2) Order 1993 (S.I. 1993/1218)
 Income Support (General) Amendment (No. 2) Regulations 1993 (S.I. 1993/1219)
 A27 Trunk Road (Polegate Bypass) Order 1993 (S.I. 1993/1220)
 Motor Vehicles (EC Type Approval) (Amendment) Regulations 1993 (S.I. 1993/1221)
 Value Added Tax (Repayments to Third Country Traders) (Amendment) Regulations 1993 (S.I. 1993/1222)
 Value Added Tax (Repayment to Community Traders) (Amendment) Regulations 1993 (S.I. 1993/1223)
 Value Added Tax (General) (Amendment) (No. 4) Regulations 1993 (S.I. 1993/1224)
 Bromley and Greenwich (London Borough Boundaries) Order 1993 (S.I. 1993/1225)
 Medicines (Veterinary Drugs) (Renewal Applications for Licences and Animal Test Certificates) Regulations 1993 (S.I. 1993/1227)
 Beer Regulations 1993 (S.I. 1993/1228)
 Financial Services (Designated Countries and Territories) (Overseas Insurance Companies) Order 1993 (S.I. 1993/1237)
 Scottish Hospital Endowments Research Trust (Amendment) Regulations 1993 (S.I. 1993/1238)
 National Savings Bank (Investment Deposits) (Limits) (Amendment) Order 1993 (S.I. 1993/1239)
 Soft Drinks (Amendment) Regulations 1993 (S.I. 1993/1240)
 South West Regional Flood Defence Committee Order 1993 (S.I. 1993/1241)
 Social Security (Widow's Benefit and Retirement Pensions) Amendment Regulations 1993 (S.I. 1993/1242)
 Child Abduction and Custody (Parties to Conventions) (Amendment) Order 1993 (S.I. 1993/1243)
 Iraq (United Nations) (Sequestration of Assets) Order 1993 (S.I. 1993/1244)
 Iraq (United Nations) (Sequestration of Assets) (Dependent Territories) Order 1993 (S.I. 1993/1245)
 Treaty on Open Skies (Privileges and Immunities) Order 1993 (S.I. 1993/1246)
 Treaty on Open Skies (Privileges and Immunities) (Overseas Territories) Order 1993 (S.I. 1993/1247)
 Turks and Caicos Islands Constitution (Amendment) Order 1993 (S.I. 1993/1248)
 Income-related Benefits Schemes and Social Security (Recoupment) Amendment Regulations 1993 (S.I. 1993/1249)
 Access to Health Records (Northern Ireland) Order 1993 (S.I. 1993/1250)
 Aviation Security (Jersey) Order 1993 (S.I. 1993/1251)
 Financial Provisions (Northern Ireland) Order 1993 (S.I. 1993/1252)
 Serbia and Montenegro (United Nations Sanctions) (Channel Islands) Order 1993 (S.I. 1993/1253)
 Serbia and Montenegro (United Nations Sanctions) (Isle of Man) Order 1993 (S.I. 1993/1254)
 Maximum Number of Judges (No. 2) Order 1993 (S.I. 1993/1255)
 Arbitration (Foreign Awards) Order 1993 (S.I. 1993/1256)
 Designs (Convention Countries) Order 1993 (S.I. 1993/1257)
 Patents and Marks (Convention and Relevant Countries) Order 1993 S.I. 1993/1258)
 Hackney and Tower Hamlets (London Borough Boundaries) Order 1993 (S.I. 1993/1260)
 Bromley and Lewisham (London Borough Boundaries) Order 1993 (S.I. 1993/1261)
 Kensington and Chelsea and Westminster (London Borough Boundaries) Order 1993 (S.I. 1993/1262)
 Food Premises (Registration) (Welsh Form of Application) Regulations 1993 (S.I. 1993/1270)
 Greenwich and Lewisham (London Borough Boundaries) Order 1993 (S.I. 1993/1276)
 Ealing, Hillingdon and Hounslow (London Borough Boundaries) Order 1993 (S.I. 1993/1277)
 Treatment of Spruce Bark Order 1993 (S.I. 1993/1282)
 Plant Health (Forestry) (Great Britain) Order 1993 (S.I. 1993/1283)
 Prohibition of the Keeping or the Release of Live Fish (Pikeperch) (Scotland) Order 1993 (S.I. 1993/1288)
 A27 Trunk Road (Patching Junction Improvement) Order 1993 (S.I. 1993/1293)
 A27 Trunk Road (Patching Junction Improvement Slip Roads) Order 1993 (S.I. 1993/1294)
 A27 Trunk Road (Patching Junction Improvement) (Detrunking) Order 1993 (S.I. 1993/1295)
 Concession Statements (Prescribed Information) Regulations 1993 (S.I. 1993/1300)

1301-1400
 Gipsy Encampments (City of Hereford) Order 1993 (S.I. 1993/1301)
 South Wales Police (Amalgamation) (Amendment) (No. 2) Order 1993 (S.I. 1993/1302)
 Dyfed-Powys Police (Amalgamation) (Amendment) (No. 2) Order 1993 (S.I. 1993/1303)
 Seed Potatoes (Fees) (Scotland) Regulations 1993 (S.I. 1993/1311)
 Eastwood and East Kilbride Districts (Busby) Boundaries Amendment Order 1993 (S.I. 1993/1312)
 Margate Pier and Harbour Revision Order 1992 S.I. 1993/1313)
 Integrated Administration and Control System Regulations 1993 (S.I. 1993/1317)
 Lewisham and Southwark (London Borough Boundaries) Order 1993 (S.I. 1993/1318)
 Greater London and Surrey (County and London Borough Boundaries) (No.3) Order 1993 (S.I. 1993/1319)
 Plant Health (Great Britain) Order 1993 (S.I. 1993/1320)
 Health and Safety (Fees) Regulations 1993 (S.I. 1993/1321)
 A500 Newcastle-Under-Lyme to Nantwich Trunk Road (Basford-Hough-Shavington Bypass and Slip Road) Order 1993 (S.I. 1993/1322)
 A500 Newcastle-Under-Lyme to Nantwich Trunk Road (Basford-Hough-Shavington Bypass) (Detrunking) Order 1993 (S.I. 1993/1323)
 Post Office (Abolition of Import Restrictions) Regulations 1993 (S.I. 1993/1324)
 Fishing Vessels (Safety Improvements) (Grants) Scheme 1993 (S.I. 1993/1325)
 Insurance Companies (Cancellation) Regulations 1993 (S.I. 1993/1327)
 Diseases of Animals (Therapeutic Substances) (Revocation) Order 1993 (S.I. 1993/1331)
 Foot-and-Mouth Disease (Sera and Glandular Products) (Revocation) Order 1993 (S.I. 1993/1332)
 Functions of Traffic Wardens (Amendment) Order 1993 (S.I. 1993/1334)
 Food Protection (Emergency Prohibitions) (Paralytic Shellfish Poisoning) Order 1993 (S.I. 1993/1338)
 Local Government (Committees) (Amendment) Regulations 1993 (S.I. 1993/1339)
 Merchant Shipping (Fees) (Amendment) Regulations 1993 (S.I. 1993/1340)
 Finance (No. 2) Act 1992 (Commencement No. 5) Order 1993 (S.I. 1993/1341)
 Heathrow Airport (County and London Borough Boundaries) Order 1993 (S.I. 1993/1342)
 Lambeth, Merton and Wandsworth (London Borough Boundaries) Order 1993 (S.I. 1993/1343)
 Fishing Vessels (Decommissioning) Scheme 1993 (S.I. 1993/1345)
 Ealing, Hammersmith and Fulham, and Hounslow (London Borough Boundaries) Order 1993 (S.I. 1993/1346)
 Tayside Regional Council (Backwater and Lintrathen Reservoirs) Byelaws Extension Order 1993 (S.I. 1993/1347)
 Unfair Dismissal (Increase of Compensation Limit) Order 1993 (S.I. 1993/1348)
 North and Central London (London Borough Boundaries) Order 1993 (S.I. 1993/1351)
 North London Boroughs (London Borough Boundaries) Order 1993 (S.I. 1993/1352)
 Customs and Excise (Transit) Regulations 1993 (S.I. 1993/1353)
 Civil Legal Aid (Scope) Regulations 1993 (S.I. 1993/1354)
 Act of Sederunt (Fees of Shorthand Writers in the Sheriff Court) 1993 (S.I. 1993/1355)
 Act of Sederunt (Rules of the Court of Session Amendment No.3) (Shorthand Writers' Fees) 1993 (S.I. 1993/1357)
 Haringey and Islington (London Borough Boundaries) Order 1993 (S.I. 1993/1358)
 Farmed Game Meat (Hygiene and Inspection) (Charges) Regulations 1993 (S.I. 1993/1359)
 Fresh Meat and Poultry Meat (Hygiene, Inspection and Examinations for Residues) (Charges) (Amendment) Regulations 1993 (S.I. 1993/1360)
 Pneumoconiosis, Byssinosis and Miscellaneous Diseases Benefit (Amendment) Scheme 1993 (S.I. 1993/1363)
 Combined Probation Areas (Devon) Order 1993 (S.I. 1993/1364)
 Barnet, Camden and Westminster (London Borough Boundaries) Order 1993 (S.I. 1993/1365)
 Crop Residues (Burning) Regulations 1993 (S.I. 1993/1366)
 Local Government Superannuation (Local Commissioners) Regulations 1993 (S.I. 1993/1367)
 National Health Service (Fund-Holding Practices) (Scotland) Amendment Regulations 1993 (S.I. 1993/1369)
 Lancashire County Council (Proposed Connecting Roads to M6 Motorway at Haighton) Special Roads Scheme 1992 Confirmation Instrument 1993 (S.I. 1993/1370)
 A17 Trunk Road (Leadenham Bypass) Order 1993 (S.I. 1993/1371)
 A17 Trunk Road (Leadenham Bypass) (Detrunking) Order 1993 (S.I. 1993/1372)
 King's Lynn—Newark Trunk Road (Leadenham By-pass and Slip Roads) Order 1973 (Revocation) Order 1993 (S.I. 1993/1373)
 Registered Restrictive Trading Agreements (Inspection, Copy and Certification) (Fees) Regulations 1993 (S.I. 1993/1376)
 Greater London and Surrey (County and London Borough Boundaries) (No.4) Order 1993 (S.I. 1993/1391)
 Valuation Timetable (Scotland) Amendment (No.2) Order 1993 (S.I. 1993/1400)

1401-1500
 Nene Valley Light Railway (Transfer) Order 1993 (S.I. 1993/1402)
 Home-Grown Cereals Authority (Rate of Levy) Order 1993 (S.I. 1993/1405)
 Offshore Installations (Safety Zones) Order 1993 (S.I. 1993/1406)
 High Court and County Courts Jurisdiction (Amendment) Order 1993 (S.I. 1993/1407)
 Foreign Fields (Specification) Order 1993 (S.I. 1993/1408)
 Aeroplane Noise (Limitation on Operation of Aeroplanes) Regulations 1993 (S.I. 1993/1409)
 Fire Safety and Safety of Places of Sport Act 1987 (Commencement No. 7) Order 1993 (S.I. 1993/1411)
 Sports Grounds and Sporting Events (Designation) (Scotland) Amendment Order 1993 (S.I. 1993/1412)
 Food Protection (Emergency Prohibitions) (Paralytic Shellfish Poisoning) (No. 2) Order 1993 (S.I. 1993/1413)
 Removal, Storage and Disposal of Vehicles (Prescribed Sums and Charges etc.) (Amendment) (No. 2) Regulations 1993 (S.I. 1993/1415)
 Goods Vehicles (Operators' Licences) (Temporary Use in Great Britain) (Amendment) Regulations 1993 (S.I. 1993/1416)
 Hackney, Haringey and Islington (London Borough Boundaries) Order 1993 (S.I. 1993/1417)
 Non-Domestic Rating Act 1993 (Commencement No. 1) Order 1993 (S.I. 1993/1418)
 Suckler Cow Premium Regulations 1993 (S.I. 1993/1441)
 Feeding Stuffs (Amendment) Regulations 1993 (S.I. 1993/1442)
 East London Boroughs (London Borough Boundaries) Order 1993 (S.I. 1993/1443)
 East London Boroughs (London Borough Boundaries) (No. 2) Order 1993 (S.I. 1993/1444)
 City and London Borough Boundaries Order 1993 (S.I. 1993/1445)
 Trade Effluent (Asbestos) (Scotland) Regulations 1993 (S.I. 1993/1446)
 Parking Attendants (Wearing of Uniforms) (London) Regulations 1993 (S.I. 1993/1450)
 Harbour Authorities (Variation of Constitution) Order 1993 (S.I. 1993/1451)
 Housing Renovation etc. Grants (Prescribed Forms and Particulars) (Amendment) (No. 2) Regulations 1993 (S.I. 1993/1452)
 County Council of Clwyd (A525 St Asaph—Rhyl Road, Rhuddlan Bypass Stage II) River Clwyd Bridge Scheme 1992 Confirmation Instrument 1993 (S.I. 1993/1456)
 Building Standards (Scotland) Amendment Regulations 1993 (S.I. 1993/1457)
 Borders Region (Electoral Arrangements) Order 1993 (S.I. 1993/1458)
 Road Traffic Act 1991 (Commencement No. 6 and Transitional Provisions) Order 1993 (S.I. 1993/1461)
 Hoole Island Junction (M53/A56) Chester (Detrunking) Order 1993 (S.I. 1993/1462)
 Road Traffic (Special Parking Areas) (The London Borough of Wandsworth) Order 1993 (S.I. 1993/1474)
 Removal and Disposal of Vehicles (Amendment) (No. 2) Regulations 1993 (S.I. 1993/1475)
 Food Protection (Emergency Prohibitions) (Paralytic Shellfish Poisoning) (No. 3) Order 1993 (S.I. 1993/1476)
 Plant Health Fees (Scotland) Order 1993 (S.I. 1993/1477)
 A11 Trunk Road (A505 Junction to Four Went Ways Improvement and Slip Roads) Order 1993 (S.I. 1993/1478)
 A11 Trunk Road (A505 Junction to Four Went Ways) (Detrunking) Order 1993 (S.I. 1993/1479)
 Council Tax Limitation (England) (Maximum Amounts) Order 1993 (S.I. 1993/1480)
 Food Protection (Emergency Prohibitions) (Paralytic Shellfish Poisoning) (No.4) Order 1993 (S.I. 1993/1483)
 A11 Trunk Road (Stump Cross to A505 Junction Improvement) Slip Roads Order 1993 (S.I. 1993/1484)
 M11 Motorway (Stump Cross Junction Improvement) and Connecting Roads Scheme 1993 (S.I. 1993/1485)
 A11 Trunk Road (Stump Cross to A505 Junction Improvement) (Detrunking) Order 1993 (S.I. 1993/1486)
 Firearms (Dangerous Air Weapons) (Amendment) Rules 1993 (S.I. 1993/1490)
 Education (Schools) Act 1992 (Commencement No. 3) Order 1993 (S.I. 1993/1491)
 Education (School Inspection) Regulations 1993 (S.I. 1993/1492)
 Non-Domestic Rating (Collection and Enforcement) (Local Lists) (Amendment) Regulations 1993 (S.I. 1993/1493)
 Non-Domestic Rating (Collection and Enforcement) (Central Lists) (Amendment) Regulations 1993 (S.I. 1993/1494)
 Non-Domestic Rating (Payment of Interest) (Amendment) Regulations 1993 (S.I. 1993/1495)
 Non-Domestic Rating Contributions (England) (Amendment) Regulations 1993 (S.I. 1993/1496)
 Local Authorities' Traffic Orders (Procedure) (England and Wales) (Amendment) Regulations 1993 (S.I. 1993/1500)

1501-1600
 A4074 Trunk Road (Crowmarsh Bypass) (Detrunking) Order 1993 (S.I. 1993/1501)
 Education (School Information)(England) Regulations 1993 (S.I. 1993/1502)
 Education (School Performance Information) (England) Regulations 1993 (S.I. 1993/1503)
 Non-Domestic Rating Contributions (Wales) (Amendment) Regulations 1993 (S.I. 1993/1505)
 Non-Domestic Rating (Demand Notices) (Wales) (Amendment) Regulations 1993 (S.I. 1993/1506)
 Value Added Tax (Supply of Services) Order 1993 (S.I. 1993/1507)
 Rent Act 1977 (Forms etc.) (Welsh Forms and Particulars) Regulations 1993 (S.I. 1993/1511)
 Non-Domestic Rating Act 1993 (Commencement No. 2) Order 1993 (S.I. 1993/1512)
 Food Protection (Emergency Prohibitions) (Paralytic Shellfish Poisoning) (No.5) Order 1993 (S.I. 1993/1515)
 Charging Orders (Residential Accommodation) (Scotland) Order 1993 (S.I. 1993/1516)
 Financial Assistance for Environmental Purposes (No. 2) Order 1993 (S.I. 1993/1518)
 Egg Products Regulations 1993 (S.I. 1993/1520)
 Gas (Meters) (Amendment) Regulations 1993 (S.I. 1993/1521)
 Northern Ireland (Emergency and Prevention of Terrorism Provisions) (Continuance) Order 1993 (S.I. 1993/1522)
 Food Protection (Emergency Prohibitions) (Paralytic Shellfish Poisoning) (No.6) Order 1993 (S.I. 1993/1523)
 Education (School Inspection) (Wales) Regulations 1993 (S.I. 1993/1529)
 Cosmetic Products (Safety) (Amendment)Regulations 1993 (S.I. 1993/1539)
 Income-related Benefits Schemes (Miscellaneous Amendments) (No. 3) Regulations 1993 (S.I. 1993/1540)
 Firearms (Dangerous Air Weapons) (Scotland) Amendment Rules 1993 (S.I. 1993/1541)
 First Community National Health Service Trust (Change of Name) Order 1993 (S.I. 1993/1543)
 Mental Health Foundation of Mid Staffordshire National Health Service Trust (Change of Name) Order 1993 (S.I. 1993/1544)
 Special Trustees for the Royal London Hospital (Transfer of Trust Property) Order 1993 (S.I. 1993/1545)
 Child Resistant Packaging (Safety) (Amendment) Regulations 1993 (S.I. 1993/1546)
 Toys (Safety)(Amendment) Regulations 1993 (S.I. 1993/1547)
 Addenbrooke's National Health Service Trust (Transfer of Trust Property) Order 1993 (S.I. 1993/1564)
 Foreign Fields (Specification) (Amendment) Order 1993 (S.I. 1993/1565)
 Foreign Fields (Specification) (No. 2) Order 1993 (S.I. 1993/1566)
 Reconstitution of the Dearne and Dove Internal Drainage Board Order 1993 (S.I. 1993/1570)
 European Communities (Designation)(No. 2) Order 1993 (S.I. 1993/1571)
 House of Commons Disqualification Order 1993 (S.I. 1993/1572)
 Child Abduction and Custody (Parties to Conventions) (Amendment) (No. 2) Order 1993 (S.I. 1993/1573)
 Extradition (Hijacking) (Amendment) Order 1993 (S.I. 1993/1574)
 Iraq (United Nations) (Sequestration of Assets) (Isle of Man) Order 1993 (S.I. 1993/1575)
 Family Law (Northern Ireland) Order 1993 (S.I. 1993/1576)
 Family Law (Northern Ireland Consequential Amendments) Order 1993 (S.I. 1993/1577)
 Fire Services (Amendment) (Northern Ireland) Order 1993 (S.I. 1993/1578)
 Social Security (Amendment) (Northern Ireland) Order 1993 (S.I. 1993/1579)
 Merchant Shipping (Prevention of Oil Pollution) (Amendment) Order 1993 (S.I. 1993/1580)
 Merchant Shipping (Prevention of Pollution by Garbage) (Amendment) Order 1993 (S.I. 1993/1581)
 International Carriage of Perishable Foodstuffs (Amendment) Regulations 1993 (S.I. 1993/1589)
 Swavesey Internal Drainage Board Award Drains Variation Order 1993 (S.I. 1993/1590)
 Wireless Telegraphy (Short Range Devices) (Exemption) Regulations 1993 (S.I. 1993/1591)
 Montrose Harbour Revision Order 1993 (S.I. 1993/1592)
 Local Government Superannuation (Scotland) Amendment Regulations 1993 (S.I. 1993/1593)
 Severn Bridge Regulations 1993 (S.I. 1993/1595)

1601-1700
 Department of Transport (Fees) (Amendment) Order 1993 (S.I. 1993/1601)
 Motor Vehicles (Driving Licences) (Amendment) Regulations 1993 (S.I. 1993/1602)
 Motor Vehicles (Driving Licences) (Large Goods and Passenger-Carrying Vehicles) (Amendment) Regulations 1993 (S.I. 1993/1603)
 Education (School and Placing Information) (Scotland) Amendment, Etc., Regulations 1993 (S.I. 1993/1604)
 Education (Provision of Information as to Schools) (Scotland) Regulations 1993 (S.I. 1993/1605)
 Food Protection (Emergency Prohibitions) (Paralytic Shellfish Poisoning) (No.7) Order 1993 (S.I. 1993/1606)
 Swanage Light Railway (Extension) Order 1993 (S.I. 1993/1607)
 Council Tax Limitation (Wales) (Maximum Amount) Order 1993 (S.I. 1993/1608)
 Further Education (Prescription of Different Date for Property Agreements) (Scotland) Order 1993 (S.I. 1993/1614)
 Health Boards (Membership and Procedure) (No. 2) Amendment Regulations 1993 (S.I. 1993/1615)
 Education (Student Loans) (Amendment) Regulations 1993 (S.I. 1993/1620)
 Community Action (Miscellaneous Provisions) Order 1993 (S.I. 1993/1621)
 Air Navigation (General) Regulations 1993 (S.I. 1993/1622)
 Debts of Overseas Governments (Determination of Relevant Percentage) (Amendment) Regulations 1993 (S.I. 1993/1623)
 Charities (Exemption from Accounting Requirements) (Scotland) Regulations 1993 (S.I. 1993/1624)
 Right to Purchase (Prescribed Persons) (Scotland) Order 1993 (S.I. 1993/1625)
 Sheep Annual Premium and Suckler Cow Premium Quotas Regulations 1993 (S.I. 1993/1626)
 Castle Vale Housing Action Trust (Area and Constitution) Order 1993 (S.I. 1993/1634)
 Gipsy Encampments (Borough of Surrey Heath) Order 1993 (S.I. 1993/1635)
 Tower Hamlets Housing Action Trust (Area and Constitution) Order 1993 (S.I. 1993/1636)
 Value Added Tax (General) (Amendment) (No. 5) Regulations 1993 (S.I. 1993/1639)
 Reconstitution of the Witham First District Internal Drainage Board Order 1993 (S.I. 1993/1640)
 Import (Plant Health Fees) (England and Wales) Order 1993 (S.I. 1993/1641)
 Plant Passport (Plant Health Fees) (England and Wales) Regulations 1993 (S.I. 1993/1642)
 Environmental Protection (Controls on Injurious Substances) (No. 2) Regulations 1993 (S.I. 1993/1643)
 Alcan Aluminium UK Ltd. (Rateable Values) (Scotland) Order 1993 (S.I. 1993/1644)
 Forth Ports plc (Rateable Values) (Scotland) Order 1993 (S.I. 1993/1645)
 Caledonian MacBrayne Limited (Rateable Values) (Scotland) Order 1993 (S.I. 1993/1646)
 Tunbridge Wells and Eridge Light Railway Order 1993 (S.I. 1993/1651)
 Asylum and Immigration Appeals Act 1993 (Commencement and Transitional Provisions) Order 1993 (S.I. 1993/1655)
 Immigration (Restricted Right of Appeal against Deportation) (Exemption) Order 1993 (S.I. 1993/1656)
 Immigration (Variation of Leave) (Amendment) Order 1993 (S.I. 1993/1657)
 Extraction Solvents in Food Regulations 1993 (S.I. 1993/1658)
 Education (Assisted Places) (Scotland) Amendment Regulations 1993 (S.I. 1993/1659)
 St Mary's Music School (Aided Places) Amendment Regulations 1993 (S.I. 1993/1660)
 Asylum Appeals (Procedure) Rules 1993 (S.I. 1993/1661)
 Immigration Appeals (Procedure) (Amendment) Rules 1993 (S.I. 1993/1662)
 Offshore Installations (Safety Zones) (No. 2) Order 1993 (S.I. 1993/1664)
 Recreation Grounds (Revocation of Parish Council Byelaws) Order 1993 (S.I. 1993/1665)
 Merchant Shipping (Fees) (Amendment) (No. 2) Regulations 1993 (S.I. 1993/1676)
 Export of Goods (Control) (Haiti) Order 1993 (S.I. 1993/1677)
 Immigration (Transit Visa) Order 1993 (S.I. 1993/1678)
 Income Support (General) Amendment No. 3 Regulations 1993 (S.I. 1993/1679)
 Merchant Shipping (Prevention of Oil Pollution) (Amendment) Regulations 1993 (S.I. 1993/1680)
 Merchant Shipping (Prevention of Pollution by Garbage) (Amendment) Regulations 1993 (S.I. 1993/1681)
 Diseases of Animals (Seizure) Order 1993 (S.I. 1993/1685)
 Road Traffic Act 1991 (Commencement No. 6 and Transitional Provisions) (Amendment) Order 1993 (S.I. 1993/1686)
 Football Spectators Act 1989 (Commencement No. 4) Order 1993 (S.I. 1993/1690)
 Football Spectators (Designation of Football Matches in England and Wales) Order 1993 (S.I. 1993/1691)
 Export of Goods (Control) (Amendment No. 2) Order 1993 (S.I. 1993/1692)
 Road Traffic Offenders (Prescribed Devices) Order 1993 (S.I. 1993/1698)
 A249 Trunk Road (Brielle Way/Docks Entrance) Order 1993 (S.I. 1993/1700)

1701-1800
 Craigie College of Education (Closure) (Scotland) Order 1993 (S.I. 1993/1701)
 Supply of Razors and Razor Blades (Interim Provision) (Revocation) Order 1993 (S.I. 1993/1702)
 Merger Situation (Stora/Swedish Match/Gillette) (Interim Provision) (Revocation) Order 1993 (S.I. 1993/1703)
 Land Registration (Charities) Rules 1993 (S.I. 1993/1704)
 A65 Trunk Road (Gargrave Bypass) Order 1990 Amendment and New Trunk Road Order 1993 (S.I. 1993/1705)
 A65 Trunk Road (Horse Pasture Laithe to Heber Barn) (Detrunking) Order 1993 (S.I. 1993/1706)
 Removal and Disposal of Vehicles(Amendment) (No. 3) Regulations 1993 (S.I. 1993/1708)
 Inshore Fishing (Prohibition of Fishing for Cockles) (Scotland) Order 1993 (S.I. 1993/1709)
 Motor Vehicles (Designation of Approval Marks) (Amendment) Regulations 1993 (S.I. 1993/1710)
 Plant Breeders' Rights (Trees, Shrubs and Woody Climbers) (Variation) Scheme 1993 (S.I. 1993/1733)
 Beef Special Premium Regulations 1993 (S.I. 1993/1734)
 Reconstitution of the Upper Witham Internal Drainage Board Order 1993 (S.I. 1993/1738)
 Social Security (Introduction of Disability Living Allowance) (Amendment) (No.2) Regulations 1993 (S.I. 1993/1739)
 Kent and East Sussex (County Boundaries) Order 1993 (S.I. 1993/1742)
 Coal Industry (Restructuring Grants) Order 1993 (S.I. 1993/1745)
 Chemicals (Hazard Information and Packaging) Regulations 1993 (S.I. 1993/1746)
 A35 Trunk Road (Tolpuddle to Puddletown Bypass and Slip Roads) Order 1993 (S.I. 1993/1747)
 A35 Trunk Road (Tolpuddle to Puddletown Bypass) (Detrunking) Order 1993 (S.I. 1993/1748)
 Environmental Protection (Prescribed Processes and Substances) (Amendment) Regulations 1993 (S.I. 1993/1749)
 Northern Ireland Act 1974 (Interim Period Extension) Order 1993 (S.I. 1993/1753)
 Social Security (Unemployment, Sickness and Invalidity Benefit) Amendment Regulations 1993 (S.I. 1993/1754)
 Education (School Teachers' Pay and Conditions) (No. 2) Order 1993 (S.I. 1993/1755)
 Civil Legal Aid (General) (Amendment) (No. 2) Regulations 1993 (S.I. 1993/1756)
 North Circular Trunk Road (A406) and A1400 Trunk Road (Waltham Forest and Redbridge) (Speed Limits) Order 1993 (S.I. 1993/1757)
 Road Vehicles (Registration and Licensing) (Amendment) Regulations (Northern Ireland) 1993 (S.I. 1993/1759)
 Road Vehicles (Registration and Licensing) (Amendment) Regulations 1993 (S.I. 1993/1760)
 Bradford Community Health National Health Service Trust (Transfer of Trust Property) Order 1993 (S.I. 1993/1761)
 Bradford Hospitals National Health Service Trust (Transfer of Trust Property) Order 1993 (S.I. 1993/1762)
 Chesterfield and North Derbyshire Royal Hospital National Health Service Trust (Transfer of Trust Property) Order 1993 (S.I. 1993/1763)
 Doncaster Royal Infirmary and Montagu Hospital National Health Service Trust (Transfer of Trust Property) Order 1993 (S.I. 1993/1764)
 Eastbourne and County Healthcare National Health Service Trust (Transfer of Trust Property) Order 1993 (S.I. 1993/1765)
 Northern Devon Healthcare National Health Service Trust (Transfer of Trust Property) Order 1993 (S.I. 1993/1766)
 South Buckinghamshire National Health Service Trust (Transfer of Trust Property) Order 1993 (S.I. 1993/1767)
 South Worcestershire Community National Health Service Trust (Transfer of Trust Property) Order 1993 (S.I. 1993/1768)
 Commons Registration (Disposal of Disputed Registrations) (Amendment) Regulations 1993 (S.I. 1993/1771)
 Civil Defence (General Local Authority Functions) (Scotland) Regulations 1993 (S.I. 1993/1774)
 Education (Bursaries for Teacher Training) (Amendment) Regulations 1993 (S.I. 1993/1775)
 Gipsy Encampments (District of South Cambridgeshire) Order 1993 (S.I. 1993/1776)
 Local Government Finance Act 1992 (Recovery of Community Charge) Saving Order 1993 (S.I. 1993/1780)
 Consular Fees (Amendment) Order 1993 (S.I. 1993/1781)
 Continental Shelf (Designation of Areas) (No. 2) Order 1993 (S.I. 1993/1782)
 European Communities (Definition of Treaties) (Agreement on Customs Union and Co-operation between the European Economic Community and the Republic of San Marino) Order 1993 (S.I. 1993/1783)
 Haiti (United Nations Sanctions) Order 1993 (S.I. 1993/1784)
 Haiti (United Nations Sanctions) (Dependent Territories) Order 1993 (S.I. 1993/1785)
 Merchant Shipping Act 1979 (Overseas Territories) (Amendment) Order 1993 (S.I. 1993/1786)
 United Nations Arms Embargoes (Liberia, Somalia and the Former Yugoslavia) Order 1993 (S.I. 1993/1787)
 Appropriation (No. 2) (Northern Ireland) Order 1993 (S.I. 1993/1788)
 British Nationality (Hong Kong) (Selection Scheme) (Amendment) Order 1993 (S.I. 1993/1789)
 Criminal Justice Act 1988 (Designated Countries and Territories) (Amendment) Order 1993 (S.I. 1993/1790)
 Criminal Justice (International Co-operation) Act 1990 (Enforcement of Overseas Forfeiture Orders) (Amendment) Order 1993 (S.I. 1993/1791)
 Drug Trafficking Offences Act 1986 (Designated Countries and Territories) (Amendment) Order 1993 (S.I. 1993/1792)
 Haiti (United Nations Sanctions) (Channel Islands) Order 1993 (S.I. 1993/1793)
 Haiti (United Nations Sanctions)(Isle of Man) Order 1993 (S.I. 1993/1794)
 Hong Kong (British Nationality) (Amendment) Order 1993 (S.I. 1993/1795)
 Immigration (Guernsey) Order 1993 (S.I. 1993/1796)
 Immigration (Jersey) Order 1993 (S.I. 1993/1797)
 Iraq (United Nations) (Sequestration of Assets) (Guernsey) Order 1993 (S.I. 1993/1798)
 Iraq (United Nations) (Sequestration of Assets) (Jersey) Order 1993 (S.I. 1993/1799)
 Double Taxation Relief (Taxes on Income) (Ghana) Order 1993 (S.I. 1993/1800)

1801-1900
 Double Taxation Relief (Taxes on Income) (India) Order 1993 (S.I. 1993/1801)
 Double Taxation Relief (Taxes on Income) (Uganda) Order 1993 (S.I. 1993/1802)
 Double Taxation Relief (Taxes on Income) (Ukraine) Order 1993 (S.I. 1993/1803)
 Army, Air Force and Naval Discipline Acts (Continuation) Order 1993 (S.I. 1993/1804)
 Films Co-Production Agreements (Amendment) Order 1993 (S.I. 1993/1805)
 Confiscation of the Proceeds of Drug Trafficking (Designated Countries and Territories) (Scotland) Amendment Order 1993 (S.I. 1993/1806)
 Criminal Justice (International Co-operation) Act 1990 (Enforcement of Overseas Forfeiture Orders) (Scotland) Amendment Order 1993 (S.I. 1993/1807)
 Development Board for Rural Wales (Transfer of Housing Stock) Regulations 1993 (S.I. 1993/1808)
 Civil Courts (Amendment) Order 1993 (S.I. 1993/1809)
 Local Government Superannuation (National Rivers Authority) Regulations 1993 (S.I. 1993/1810)
 Cardiothoracic Centre–Liverpool National Health Service Trust (Establishment) Amendment Order 1993 (S.I. 1993/1811)
 Civil Defence (General Local Authority Functions) Regulations 1993 (S.I. 1993/1812)
 Channel Tunnel (International Arrangements) Order 1993 (S.I. 1993/1813)
 Local Government Superannuation (Part-time Employees) Regulations 1993 (S.I. 1993/1814)
 Disclosure of Interests in Shares (Amendment) Regulations 1993 (S.I. 1993/1819)
 Partnerships and Unlimited Companies (Accounts) Regulations 1993 (S.I. 1993/1820)
 Income Tax (Interest Relief) (Qualifying Lenders) (No. 2) Order 1993 (S.I. 1993/1821)
 Occupational Pension Schemes (Preservation of Benefit) Amendment Regulations 1993 (S.I. 1993/1822)
 Offshore Safety (Repeals and Modifications) Regulations 1993 (S.I. 1993/1823)
 Export of Goods (Control) (Amendment No. 4) Order 1993 (S.I. 1993/1825)
 Financial Services (Disclosure of Information) (Designated Authorities) (No. 7) Order 1993 (S.I. 1993/1826)
 Church of England (Legal Aid) Rules 1993 (S.I. 1993/1840)
 Diocesan Chancellorship Regulations 1993 (S.I. 1993/1841)
 Ecclesiastical Judges and Legal Officers (Fees) Order 1993 (S.I. 1993/1842)
 Legal Officers (Annual Fees) Order 1993 (S.I. 1993/1843)
 Parochial Fees Order 1993 (S.I. 1993/1844)
 Local Government Superannuation (Investments) Regulations 1993 (S.I. 1993/1848)
 Highways (Traffic Calming) Regulations 1993 (S.I. 1993/1849)
 Education (Mandatory Awards) Regulations 1993 (S.I. 1993/1850)
 Social Security (Invalid Care Allowance) Amendment (No. 2) Regulations 1993 (S.I. 1993/1851)
 Assisted Areas Order 1993 (S.I. 1993/1877)
 Seed Potatoes (Amendment) Regulations 1993 (S.I. 1993/1878)
 Public Telecommunication System Designation (City of London Telecommunications Ltd) Order 1993 (S.I. 1993/1879)
 Public Telecommunication System Designation (Ionica L3 Ltd) Order 1993 (S.I. 1993/1880)
 Companies Act 1989 (Recognised Supervisory Bodies) (Periodical Fees) Regulations 1993 (S.I. 1993/1881)
 Learning for Work (Scottish Enterprise and Highlands and Islands Enterprise Programmes) Order 1993 (S.I. 1993/1882)
 Norway Lobsters (Prohibition of Method of Fishing) Order 1993 (S.I. 1993/1887)
 Occupational Pension Schemes (Public Service Pension Schemes) (Amendment) Regulations 1993 (S.I. 1993/1888)
 Magistrates' Courts Fees (Amendment) Order 1993 (S.I. 1993/1889)
 Medicines (Products Other Than Veterinary Dmgs) (Prescription Only) Amendment Order 1993 (S.I. 1993/1890)
 Colleges of Further Education (Changes of Names) (Scotland) Order 1993 (S.I. 1993/1891)
 Education (Access Funds) (Scotland) Amendment Regulations 1993 (S.I. 1993/1892)
 Offshore Installations (Safety Zones)(No. 3) Order 1993 (S.I. 1993/1893)
 Assisted Areas (Amendment) Order 1993 (S.I. 1993/1894)
 Legal Aid in Criminal and Care Proceedings (General) (Amendment) (No. 2) Regulations 1993 (S.I. 1993/1895)
 Neath—Abergavenny Trunk Road (A465) (Improvement from Aberdulais to Glynneath, Aberdulais Slip Roads) Order 1993 (S.I. 1993/1896)
 Management and Administration of Safety and Health at Mines Regulations 1993 (S.I. 1993/1897)
 Poultry Breeding Flocks and Hatcheries Order 1993 (S.I. 1993/1898)
 Meat and Livestock Commission Levy (Variation) Scheme (Confirmation) Order 1993 (S.I. 1993/1899)
 Local Government (Scotland) Act 1975 (Local Authority Borrowing Limit) Order 1993 (S.I. 1993/1900)

1901-2000
 Nurses, Midwives and Health Visitors (Entry to Examinations and Training Requirements) Amendment Rules Approval Order 1993 (S.I. 1993/1901)
 Trade Union Reform and Employment Rights Act 1993 (Commencement No. 1 and Transitional Provisions) Order 1993 (S.I. 1993/1908)
 Trade Union Ballots and Elections (Independent Scrutineer Qualifications) Order 1993 (S.I. 1993/1909)
 Teddington Memorial Hospital National Health Service Trust (Establishment) Amendment Order 1993 (S.I. 1993/1932)
 Money Laundering Regulations 1993 (S.I. 1993/1933)
 Public Telecommunication System Designation (Scottish Hydro-Electric plc) Order 1993 (S.I. 1993/1934)
 Public Telecommunication System Designation (Energis Communications Limited) Order 1993 (S.I. 1993/1935)
 Education (Assisted Places) (Amendment) Regulations 1993 (S.I. 1993/1936)
 Education (Assisted Places) (Incidental Expenses) (Amendment) Regulations 1993 (S.I. 1993/1937)
 Education (Grants) (Music and Ballet Schools) (Amendment) Regulations 1993 (S.I. 1993/1938)
 Social Security (Disability Living Allowance) (Amendment) Regulations 1993 (S.I. 1993/1939)
 Food Protection (Emergency Prohibitions) (Paralytic Shellfish Poisoning) (No.4 and No.7) Orders 1993 Revocation Order 1993 (S.I. 1993/1940)
 Value Added Tax (General) (Amendment) (No. 6) Regulations 1993 (S.I. 1993/1941)
 Road Vehicles (Construction and Use) (Amendment) (No. 1) Regulations 1993 (S.I. 1993/1946)
 Tobacco Products Labelling (Safety) Amendment Regulations 1993 (S.I. 1993/1947)
 Learning for Work (Miscellaneous Provisions) Order 1993 (S.I. 1993/1949)
 Act of Adjournal (Consolidation Amendment) (Courses for Drink-drive Offenders) 1993 (S.I. 1993/1955)
 Act of Sederunt (Sheriff Court Ordinary Cause Rules) 1993 (S.I. 1993/1956)
 Double Taxation Relief (Taxes on Income) (General) (Manufactured Overseas Dividends) Regulations 1993 (S.I. 1993/1957)
 Dartford–Thurrock Crossing (Amendment) Regulations 1993 (S.I. 1993/1961)
 Harwich Haven Harbour Revision Order 1993 (S.I. 1993/1962)
 A4 Trunk Road (Great West Road, Hounslow) (Prescribed Routes) Order 1993 (S.I. 1993/1963)
 London South Circular Trunk Road (A205) (Westhorne Avenue, Lewisham) (Prohibition of Use of Gaps in Central Reserve) Order 1993 (S.I. 1993/1964)
 Civil Aviation (Route Charges for Navigation Services) Regulations 1993 (S.I. 1993/1965)
 Importation of Bovine Semen (Amendment) Regulations 1993 (S.I. 1993/1966)
 Animals and Animal Products (Import and Export) (Amendment) Regulations 1993 (S.I. 1993/1967)
 Criminal Justice Act 1993 (Commencement No. 1) Order 1993 (S.I. 1993/1968)
 Education (Teachers) (Amendment) Regulations 1993 (S.I. 1993/1969)
 Clyde Port Authority (Dissolution) Order 1993 (S.I. 1993/1970)
 Education Act 1993 (Commencement No. 1 and Transitional Provisions) Order 1993 (S.I. 1993/1975)
 Education (London Oratory School) (Exemption from Pay and Conditions Orders) Order 1993 (S.I. 1993/1976)
 Further Education (Attribution of Surpluses and Deficits) (The Ridge College) Regulations 1993 (S.I. 1993/1977)
 County Court (Pensions Ombudsman) (Enforcement of Directions and Determinations) Rules 1993 (S.I. 1993/1978)
 Education (School Inspection) (Wales) (No. 2) Regulations 1993 (S.I. 1993/1982)
 Education (National Curriculum) (Assessment Arrangements for the Core Subjects) (Key Stage 1) Order 1993 (S.I. 1993/1983)
 Education (National Curriculum) (Assessment Arrangements for the Core Subjects) (Key Stage 3) Order 1993 (S.I. 1993/1984)
 Social Security (Industrial Injuries) (Prescribed Diseases) Amendment (No. 2) Regulations 1993 (S.I. 1993/1985)
 Education (School Inspection) (No. 2) Regulations 1993 (S.I. 1993/1986)
 Education (Further Education in Schools) Regulations 1993 (S.I. 1993/1987)
 A27 Trunk Road (Polegate Bypass Slip Roads) Order 1993 (S.I. 1993/1990)
 A27 Trunk Road (Polegate Bypass De-Trunking)Order 1993 (S.I. 1993/1991)
 A259 Trunk Road Brookland Diversion Order 1993 (S.I. 1993/1992)
 Education (Further Education Institutions Information) (England) Regulations 1993 (S.I. 1993/1993)
 Merchant Shipping (Load Lines) Act 1967 (Unregistered Ships) Order 1993 (S.I. 1993/1994)
 Poultry Breeding Flocks, Hatcheries and Processed Animal Protein (Fees) Order 1993 (S.I. 1993/1998)

2001-2100
 Value Added Tax (Payments on Account) Order 1993 (S.I. 1993/2001)
 Friendly Societies Appeal Tribunal Regulations 1993 (S.I. 1993/2002)
 Income Tax (Stock Lending) (Amendment) Regulations 1993 (S.I. 1993/2003)
 Income Tax (Manufactured Overseas Dividends) Regulations 1993 (S.I. 1993/2004)
 Cereal Seeds Regulations 1993 (S.I. 1993/2005)
 Beet Seeds Regulations 1993 (S.I. 1993/2006)
 Oil and Fibre Plant Seeds Regulations 1993 (S.I. 1993/2007)
 Vegetable Seeds Regulations 1993 (S.I. 1993/2008)
 Fodder Plant Seeds Regulations 1993 (S.I. 1993/2009)
 Tuberculosis (Deer) (Amendment) Order 1993 (S.I. 1993/2010)
 Local Government Superannuation (Scotland) Amendment (No.2) Regulations 1993 (S.I. 1993/2013)
 Local Authorities (Capital Finance) (Amendment) (No. 2) Regulations 1993 (S.I. 1993/2014)
 Fishing Boats (Marking and Documentation) (Enforcement) Order 1993 (S.I. 1993/2015)
 Sea Fishing (Enforcement of Community Control Measures) Order 1993 (S.I. 1993/2016)
 Food Premises (Registration) Amendment Regulations 1993 (S.I. 1993/2022)
 Criminal Justice Act 1993 (Commencement No. 2 Transitional Provisions and Savings) (Scotland) Order 1993 (S.I. 1993/2035)
 Public Trusts (Reorganisation) (Scotland) Regulations 1993 (S.I. 1993/2036)
 Agricultural Holdings (Units of Production) Order 1993 (S.I. 1993/2037)
 Agriculture Act 1993 (Commencement No. 1) Order 1993 (S.I. 1993/2038)
 Agriculture Act 1993 (Specification of Year) (Potato Target Area) Order 1993 (S.I. 1993/2039)
 International Development Association (Tenth Replenishment) Order 1993 (S.I. 1993/2046)
 Police (Amendment) (No.3) Regulations 1993 (S.I. 1993/2047)
 Goods Vehicles (Plating and Testing) (Amendment) Regulations 1993 (S.I. 1993/2048)
 National Health Service (Travelling Expenses and Remission of Charges) (Scotland) Amendment (No.2) Regulations 1993 (S.I. 1993/2049)
 Prisoners and Criminal Proceedings (Scotland) Act 1993 Commencement, Transitional Provisions and Savings Order 1993 (S.I. 1993/2050)
 A34 Trunk Road (A34/M4 Junction 13 Improvement) Line and Slip Roads Order 1993 (S.I. 1993/2056)
 A6 Trunk Road (Great Glen Bypass) Order 1993 (S.I. 1993/2057)
 A6 Trunk Road (Great Glen Bypass) (Detrunking) Order 1993 (S.I. 1993/2058)
 Easington Lagoons (Area of Special Protection) (No.2) Order 1993 (S.I. 1993/2059)
 Capacity Serving Measures (Intoxicating Liquor) (Amendment) Regulations 1993 (S.I. 1993/2060)
 Enforcement of Road Traffic Debts (Certificated Bailiffs) Regulations 1993 (S.I. 1993/2072)
 Enforcement of Road Traffic Debts Order 1993 (S.I. 1993/2073)
 Education (School Performance Information) (England) (No. 2) Regulations 1993 (S.I. 1993/2077)
 Housing Renovation etc. Grants (Prescribed Forms and Particulars) (Welsh Forms and Particulars) (Amendment) (No. 2) Regulations 1993 (S.I. 1993/2078)
 Lerwick Harbour Revision Order 1993 (S.I. 1993/2087)
 Safety of Sports Grounds (Designation) Order 1993 (S.I. 1993/2090)
 Essex and Greater London (County Boundaries) Order 1993 (S.I. 1993/2091)
 Social Security (Contributions) Amendment (No. 6) Regulations 1993 (S.I. 1993/2094)
 Local Authorities (Goods and Services) (Public Bodies) Order 1993 (S.I. 1993/2097)
 Gipsy Encampments (District of South Shropshire) Order 1993 (S.I. 1993/2098)

2101-2200
 Animals (Scientific Procedures) Act (Amendment) Regulations 1993 (S.I. 1993/2102)
 Animals (Scientific Procedures) Act(Amendment) Order 1993 (S.I. 1993/2103)
 Closure of Prisons (H.M. Young Offender Institution Campsfield House) Order 1993 (S.I. 1993/2104)
 Gas (Authorisation Application) (Amendment) Regulations 1993 (S.I. 1993/2105)
 Nurses, Midwives and Health Visitors (Midwives Amendment) Rules Approval Order 1993 (S.I. 1993/2106)
 London South Circular Trunk Road (A205)(Thurlow Park Road, Lambeth) (Prohibition of Right Turn) Order 1993 (S.I. 1993/2107)
 Social Security (Claims and Payments) Amendment (No. 3) Regulations 1993 (S.I. 1993/2113)
 Airports (Designation) (Removal and Disposal of Vehicles) (Amendment) Order 1993 (S.I. 1993/2117)
 Housing Benefit and Council Tax Benefit (Miscellaneous Amendments) Regulations 1993 (S.I. 1993/2118)
 Income-related Benefits Schemes (Miscellaneous Amendments) (No. 4) Regulations 1993 (S.I. 1993/2119)
 Goods Vehicles (Operators' Licences) (Temporary Use in Great Britain) (Amendment) (No. 2) Regulations 1993 (S.I. 1993/2120)
 Air Navigation (Restriction of Flying) (High Security Prisons) (Amendment No. 3) Regulations 1993 (S.I. 1993/2123)
 Winchester–Preston Trunk Road (A34) (Newbury Bypass Detrunking) (No.2) Order 1993 (S.I. 1993/2128)
 Winchester–Preston Trunk Road (A34) (Newbury Bypass) Slip Roads (No.3) Order 1993 (S.I. 1993/2129)
 East Worcester and Severn Trent Water (Amendment of Local Enactments etc.) Order 1993 (S.I. 1993/2130)
 County Court Appeals (Amendment) Order 1993 (S.I. 1993/2131)
 Courts and Legal Services Act 1990 (Commencement No. 9) Order 1993 (S.I. 1993/2132)
 Rules of the Supreme Court (Amendment) 1993 (S.I. 1993/2133)
 Leasehold Reform, Housing and Urban Development Act 1993 (Commencement and Transitional Provisions No. 1) Order 1993 (S.I. 1993/2134)
 Edinburgh Assay Office (Amendment) Order 1993 (S.I. 1993/2135)
 County Court (Amendment No. 2) Rules 1993 (S.I. 1993/2150)
 Combined Probation Areas (Hertfordshire) Order 1993 (S.I. 1993/2151)
 Manchester, Liverpool Road (Castlefield Properties Limited) Light Railway Order 1993 (S.I. 1993/2153)
 East Kent Light Railway Order 1993 (S.I. 1993/2154)
 Mental Health (Nurses) Amendment Order 1993 (S.I. 1993/2155)
 Mental Health (Hospital, Guardianship and Consent to Treatment) Amendment Regulations 1993 (S.I. 1993/2156)
 Leasehold Reform, Housing and Urban Development Act 1993 (Commencement No. 2) (Scotland) Order 1993 (S.I. 1993/2163)
 Housing (Preservation of Right to Buy) (Scotland) Regulations 1993 (S.I. 1993/2164)
 Employment Protection (Continuity of Employment) Regulations 1993 (S.I. 1993/2165)
 Controlled Drugs (Substances Useful for Manufacture) (Intra–Community Trade) Regulations 1993 (S.I. 1993/2166)
 Tobacco Products (Amendment) Regulations 1993 (S.I. 1993/2167)
 A45/A452 Trunk Roads (Stonebridge Grade Separation) Order 1993 (S.I. 1993/2168)
 Education (Further Education Institutions Information) (Wales) Regulations 1993 (S.I. 1993/2169)
 A45 Trunk Road (Middle Bickenhill to Stonebridge) (De-Trunking) Order 1993 (S.I. 1993/2170)
 Liverpool Housing Action Trust (Transfer of Property) Order 1993 (S.I. 1993/2171)
 Public Telecommunication System Designation (Bradford Cable Communications Limited) Order 1993 (S.I. 1993/2172)
 Register of County Court Judgments (Amendment No. 2) Regulations 1993 (S.I. 1993/2173)
 County Court (Forms) (Amendment No. 2) Rules 1993 (S.I. 1993/2174)
 County Court (Amendment No. 3) Rules 1993 (S.I. 1993/2175)
 St. Ives Harbour Revision Order 1993 (S.I. 1993/2176)
 Right to Purchase (Loan Application) (Scotland) Amendment Order 1993 (S.I. 1993/2181)
 Right to Purchase (Application Form) (Scotland) Order 1993 (S.I. 1993/2182)
 Education (National Curriculum) (Assessment Arrangements for English, Welsh, Mathematics and Science) (Key Stage 1) (Wales) Order 1993 (S.I. 1993/2190)
 Education (National Curriculum) (Assessment Arrangements for English, Welsh, Mathematics and Science) (Key Stage 3) (Wales) Order 1993 (S.I. 1993/2191)
 Eastwood and East Kilbride Districts (Busby) Boundaries Amendment (No.2) Order 1993 (S.I. 1993/2192)
 Education (School Performance Information) (Wales) Regulations 1993 (S.I. 1993/2194)
 National Curriculum Council and School Examinations and Assessment Council (Transfer of Property) Order 1993 (S.I. 1993/2195)
 Motor Vehicles (EC Type Approval) (Amendment) (No. 2) Regulations 1993 (S.I. 1993/2198)
 Road Vehicles (Construction and Use) (Amendment) (No. 2) Regulations 1993 (S.I. 1993/2199)
 Motor Vehicles (Type Approval for Goods Vehicles) (Great Britain) (Amendment) Regulations 1993 (S.I. 1993/2200)

2201-2300
 Motor Vehicles (Type Approval) (Great Britain) (Amendment) Regulations 1993 (S.I. 1993/2201)
 Bananas (Interim Measures) (Revocation) Regulations 1993 (S.I. 1993/2204)
 Wireless Telegraphy (Television Licence Fees) (Amendment) (No. 2) Regulations 1993 (S.I. 1993/2205)
 National Health Service (General Dental Services) Amendment Regulations 1993 (S.I. 1993/2209)
 Dental Vocational Training Authority Regulations 1993 (S.I. 1993/2210)
 Dental Vocational Training Authority (Establishment and Constitution) and Appeal Body (Specification) Order 1993 (S.I. 1993/2211)
 Taxes (Interest Rate) (Amendment No. 3) Regulations 1993 (S.I. 1993/2212)
 Friendly Societies Act 1992 (Commencement No.6 and Transitional Provisions) Order 1993 (S.I. 1993/2213)
 Finance Act 1993 (Appointed Day) Order 1993 (S.I. 1993/2214)
 Finance Act 1993, section 12, (Appointed Day) Order 1993 (S.I. 1993/2215)
 National Health Service (District Health Authorities) (No.2) Order 1993 (S.I. 1993/2218)
 National Health Service (Determination of Districts) (No.2) Order 1993 (S.I. 1993/2219)
 National Health Service (General Dental Services) (Scotland) Amendment Regulations 1993 (S.I. 1993/2224)
 Parole Board (Scotland) Rules 1993 (S.I. 1993/2225)
 Transcripts of Criminal Proceedings (Scotland) Order 1993 (S.I. 1993/2226)
 Prison (Scotland) Amendment Rules 1993 (S.I. 1993/2227)
 Young Offenders (Scotland) Amendment Rules 1993 (S.I. 1993/2228)
 Road Traffic Act 1991 (Commencement No. 7 and Transitional Provisions) Order 1993 (S.I. 1993/2229)
 National Assistance (Assessment of Resources) (Amendment No.2) Regulations 1993 (S.I. 1993/2230)
 National Curriculum Council and School Examinations and Assessment Council (Designation of Staff) Order 1993 (S.I. 1993/2231)
 Export of Goods (Control) (Haiti) (Revocation) Order 1993 (S.I. 1993/2232)
 Motor Vehicles (Competitions and Trials) (Amendment) Regulations 1993 (S.I. 1993/2233)
 Road Traffic (Special Parking Areas) (London Boroughs of Bromley, Hammersmith and Fulham and Lewisham) (London Borough of Wandsworth) (Amendment) Order 1993 (S.I. 1993/2237)
 Housing (Extension of Right to Buy) Order 1993 (S.I. 1993/2240)
 Housing (Preservation of Right to Buy) Regulations 1993 (S.I. 1993/2241)
 Valuation Timetable (Scotland) Amendment (No.3) Order 1993 (S.I. 1993/2242)
 Housing (Right to Buy Delay Procedure) (Prescribed Forms) (Amendment) Regulations 1993 (S.I. 1993/2245)
 Housing (Right to Buy) (Prescribed Forms) (Amendment) Regulations 1993 (S.I. 1993/2246)
 Law Reform (Miscellaneous Provisions) (Scotland) Act 1990 (Commencement No.12) Order 1993 (S.I. 1993/2253)
 Public Trusts (Reorganisation) (Scotland) (No.2) Regulations 1993 (S.I. 1993/2254)
 Fish Health (Amendment) Regulations 1993 (S.I. 1993/2255)
 Royal National Hospital for Rheumatic Diseases National Health Service Trust (Transfer of Trust Property) Order 1993 (S.I. 1993/2256)
 St Peter's Hospital National Health Service Trust (Transfer of Trust Property) Order 1993 (S.I. 1993/2257)
 Bath Mental Health Care National Health Service Trust (Transfer of Trust Property) Order 1993 (S.I. 1993/2258)
 Wiltshire Health Care National Health Service Trust (Transfer of Trust Property) Order 1993 (S.I. 1993/2259)
 North Mersey Community National Health Service Trust (Transfer of Trust Property) Order 1993 (S.I. 1993/2260)
 Bath and West Community National Health Service Trust (Transfer of Trust Property) Order 1993 (S.I. 1993/2261)
 Royal United Hospital, Bath, National Health Service Trust (Transfer of Trust Property) Order 1993 (S.I. 1993/2262)
 Weybourne Community National Health Service Trust (Transfer of Trust Property) Order 1993 (S.I. 1993/2263)
 King's Lynn and Wisbech Hospitals National Health Service Trust (Transfer of Trust Property) Order 1993 (S.I. 1993/2264)
 Hydrocarbon Oil (Amendment) Regulations 1993 (S.I. 1993/2267)
 Local Government Act 1988 (Defined Activities) (Exemption) (Horsham District Council and Worthing Borough Council) Order 1993 (S.I. 1993/2269)
 Finance (No. 2) Act 1992 (Commencement No. 6 and Transitional Provisions and Savings) Order 1993 (S.I. 1993/2272)
 Income Tax (Employments) (Amendment) Regulations 1993 (S.I. 1993/2276)
 Smoke Control Areas (Exempted Fireplaces) Order 1993 (S.I. 1993/2277)
 Sea Fish Licensing (Variation) (No. 2) Order 1993 (S.I. 1993/2291)
 Friendly Societies (Proxy Voting) Regulations 1993 (S.I. 1993/2294)
 Commissioners for Oaths (Fees) Order 1993 (S.I. 1993/2297)
 Commissioners for Oaths (Authorised Persons) (Fees) Order 1993 (S.I. 1993/2298)
 Food Protection (Emergency Prohibitions) (Paralytic Shellfish Poisoning) Orders 1993 Revocation Order 1993 (S.I. 1993/2299)

2301-2400
 Sandwell Borough Council (Patent Shaft/Moorcroft Infrastructure) (Walsall Canal Bridge) Scheme 1993 Confirmation Instrument 1993 (S.I. 1993/2302)
 Civil Aviation (Canadian Navigation Services) (Fourth Amendment) Regulations 1993 (S.I. 1993/2320)
 Highlands and Islands Rural Enterprise Programme (Revocation) Regulations 1993 (S.I. 1993/2325)
 Value Added Tax (Reverse Charge) Order 1993 (S.I. 1993/2328)
 Telecommunications (Leased Lines) Regulations 1993 (S.I. 1993/2330)
 Coal Mines (Owner's Operating Rules) Regulations 1993 (S.I. 1993/2331)
 Combined Probation Areas (East Sussex) Order 1993 (S.I. 1993/2332)
 Plant Health Fees (Scotland) Amendment Order 1993 (S.I. 1993/2344)
 Environmentally Sensitive Areas (Cairngorms Straths) Designation Order 1993 (S.I. 1993/2345)
Act of Sederunt (Enforcement of Judgments under the Civil Jurisdiction and Judgments Act 1982) (Authentic Instruments and Court Settlements) 1993 (S.I. 1993/2346)
 Haydon Natural Gas Pipe–lines Order 1993 (S.I. 1993/2347)
 Croydon, Merton and Sutton (London Borough Boundaries) Order 1993 (S.I. 1993/2350)
 Angola (United Nations Sanctions) Order 1993 (S.I. 1993/2355)
 Angola (United Nations Sanctions) (Dependent Territories) Order 1993 (S.I. 1993/2356)
 Angola (United Nations Sanctions) (Channel Islands) Order 1993 (S.I. 1993/2357)
 Angola (United Nations Sanctions) (Isle of Man) Order 1993 (S.I. 1993/2358)
 Exempt Charities Order 1993 (S.I. 1993/2359)
 Clinical Thermometers (EEC Requirements) Regulations 1993 (S.I. 1993/2360)
 Ionising Radiations (Outside Workers) Regulations 1993 (S.I. 1993/2379)
 Assured and Protected Tenancies (Lettings to Students) (Amendment) Regulations 1993 (S.I. 1993/2390)
 Act of Adjournal (Consolidation Amendment No.2) (Miscellaneous) 1993 (S.I. 1993/2391)
 Medicines (Veterinary Medicinal Products) (Applications for Product Licences) Regulations 1993 (S.I. 1993/2398)
 Medicines (Veterinary Medicinal Products) (Renewal Applications for Product Licences Subject to Review) Regulations 1993 (S.I. 1993/2399)
 County Council of Clwyd (River Dee Estuary Bridge) Scheme 1992 Confirmation Instrument 1993 (S.I. 1993/2400)

2401-2500
 Environmental Protection (Prescribed Processes and Substances) (Amendment) (No. 2) Regulations 1993 (S.I. 1993/2405)
 Offshore Safety Act 1992 (Commencement No. 1) Order 1993 (S.I. 1993/2406)
 Leasehold Reform (Collective Enfranchisement and Lease Renewal) Regulations 1993 (S.I. 1993/2407)
 Rent Assessment Committee (England and Wales) (Leasehold Valuation Tribunal) Regulations 1993 (S.I. 1993/2408)
 Leasehold Reform (Notices) (Amendment) Regulations 1993 (S.I. 1993/2409)
 Local Government and Housing Act 1989 (Commencement No. 16) Order 1993 (S.I. 1993/2410)
 National Health Service (General Medical Services) Amendment (No. 2) Regulations 1993 (S.I. 1993/2421)
 Environmentally Sensitive Areas (Ynys Mo*n) Designation (Amendment) Order 1993 (S.I. 1993/2422)
 Patents (Amendment) Rules 1993 (S.I. 1993/2423)
 Pembrokeshire National Health Service Trust (Transfer of Trust Property) Order 1993 (S.I. 1993/2436)
 Strathclyde Region (Electoral Arrangements) Order 1993 (S.I. 1993/2439)
 Finance Act 1993, Section 18, (Appointed Day) Order 1993 (S.I. 1993/2446)
 National Health Service (General Medical and Pharmaceutical Services) (Scotland) Amendment (No. 2) Regulations 1993 (S.I. 1993/2449)
 Social Fund Cold Weather Payments (General) Amendment Regulations 1993 (S.I. 1993/2450)
 National Health Service (Pharmaceutical Services) Amendment Regulations 1993 (S.I. 1993/2451)
 Vehicles Excise Duty (Simplification of Goods Vehicles Rates) Order 1993 (S.I. 1993/2452)
 Restrictive Trade Practices (Standards and Arrangements) (Services) Order 1993 (S.I. 1993/2453)
 Sole (Specified Sea Areas) (Prohibition of Fishing) Order 1993 (S.I. 1993/2459)
 East Gloucestershire National Health Service Trust (Transfer of Trust Property) Order 1993 (S.I. 1993/2460)
 Mulberry National Health Service Trust (Transfer of Trust Property) Order 1993 (S.I. 1993/2461)
 Southampton Community Health Services National Health Service Trust (Transfer of Trust Property) Order 1993 (S.I. 1993/2462)
 London South Circular Trunk Road (A205)(London Road, Lewisham and Southwark) (Box Junction) Order 1993 (S.I. 1993/2463)
 London South Circular Trunk Road (A205) (Lordship Lane, Lewisham and Southwark) (Box Junction) Order 1993 (S.I. 1993/2464)
 Sole (Specified Sea Areas) (Prohibition of Fishing) (No. 2) Order 1993 (S.I. 1993/2465)
 Restrictive Trade Practices (Standards and Arrangements) (Goods) Order 1993 (S.I. 1993/2473)
 Road Traffic Accidents (Payments for Treatment) Order 1993 (S.I. 1993/2474)
 Income Tax (Interest Relief) (Qualifying Lenders) (No. 3) Order 1993 (S.I. 1993/2478)
 Offshore Installations (Safety Zones) (No. 4) Order 1993 (S.I. 1993/2479)
 Miscellaneous Factories (Transitional Provisions) Regulations 1993 (S.I. 1993/2482)
 Design Right (Semiconductor Topographies) (Amendment) Regulations 1993 (S.I. 1993/2497)
 Value Added Tax (Beverages) Order 1993 (S.I. 1993/2498)
 Smoke Control Areas (Authorised Fuels) (Amendment) Regulations 1993 (S.I. 1993/2499)

2501-2600
 Trade Union Reform and Employment Rights Act 1993 (Commencement No. 2 and Transitional Provisions) Order 1993 (S.I. 1993/2503)
 Combined Probation Areas (Dorset) Order 1993 (S.I. 1993/2512)
 Teachers' (Superannuation and Compensation for Premature Retirement) (Scotland) Amendment Regulations 1993 (S.I. 1993/2513)
 Coal Industry Act 1992 (Commencement) Order 1993 (S.I. 1993/2514)
 Export of Goods (Control) (Amendment No. 5) Order 1993 (S.I. 1993/2515)
 Friendly Societies (Qualifications of Actuaries No.2) Regulations 1993 (S.I. 1993/2518)
 Friendly Societies (Amendment) Regulations 1993 (S.I. 1993/2519)
 Friendly Societies (Insurance Business No. 2) Regulations 1993 (S.I. 1993/2520)
 Friendly Societies (Authorisation No. 2) Regulations 1993 (S.I. 1993/2521)
 A11 Trunk Road (Roudham Heath to Attleborough Improvement and Slip Roads) Order 1993 (S.I. 1993/2524)
 A11 Trunk Road (Roudham Heath to Attleborough Improvement) (Detrunking) Order 1993 (S.I. 1993/2525)
 Protection of Wrecks (Designation No. 2) Order 1993 (S.I. 1993/2526)
 Police (Amendment) (No. 4) Regulations 1993 (S.I. 1993/2527)
 Police Cadets (Amendment) Regulations 1993 (S.I. 1993/2528)
 Fodder Plant Seeds (Amendment) Regulations 1993 (S.I. 1993/2529)
 Seeds (Registration, Licensing and Enforcement) (Amendment) Regulations 1993 (S.I. 1993/2530)
 Local Government Superannuation (Maternity Absence) Regulations 1993 (S.I. 1993/2531)
 Sea Fisheries Districts (Variation) Order 1993 (S.I. 1993/2532)
 Suppression of Terrorism Act 1978 (Application of Provisions) (India) Order 1993 (S.I. 1993/2533)
 Medicines (Applications for Grant of Product Licences—Products for Human Use) Regulations 1993 (S.I. 1993/2538)
 Medicines (Standard Provisions for Licences and Certificates) Amendment (No. 2) Regulations 1993 (S.I. 1993/2539)
 Birmingham Women's Health Care National Health Service Trust (Establishment) Order 1993 (S.I. 1993/2541)
 Northern Birmingham Community Health National Health Service Trust (Establishment) Order 1993 (S.I. 1993/2542)
 South Birmingham Community Health National Health Service Trust (Establishment) Order 1993 (S.I. 1993/2543)
 Churchill John Radcliffe National Health Service Trust (Establishment) Order 1993 (S.I. 1993/2544)
 City Hospital National Health Service Trust (Establishment) Order 1993 (S.I. 1993/2545)
 Derbyshire Ambulance Service National Health Service Trust (Establishment) Order 1993 (S.I. 1993/2546)
 Derbyshire Royal Infirmary National Health Service Trust (Establishment) Order 1993 (S.I. 1993/2547)
 Dewsbury Health Care National Health Service Trust (Establishment) Order 1993 (S.I. 1993/2548)
 East Wiltshire Health Care National Health Service Trust (Establishment) Order 1993 (S.I. 1993/2549)
 East Yorkshire Community Healthcare National Health Service Trust (Establishment) Order 1993 (S.I. 1993/2550)
 George Eliot Hospital National Health Service Trust (Establishment) Order 1993 (S.I. 1993/2551)
 Hereford Hospitals National Health Service Trust (Establishment) Order 1993 (S.I. 1993/2552)
 Hereford and Worcester Ambulance Service National Health Service Trust (Establishment) Order 1993 (S.I. 1993/2553)
 Hull and Holderness Community Health National Health Service Trust (Establishment) Order 1993 (S.I. 1993/2554)
 Kent Ambulance National Health Service Trust (Establishment) Order 1993 (S.I. 1993/2555)
 Kettering General Hospital National Health Service Trust (Establishment) Order 1993 (S.I. 1993/2556)
 King's Mill Centre for Health Care Services National Health Service Trust (Establishment) Order 1993 (S.I. 1993/2557)
 Leicestershire Ambulance and Paramedic Service National Health Service Trust (Establishment) Order 1993 (S.I. 1993/2558)
 Leicestershire Mental Health Service National Health Service Trust (Establishment) Order 1993 (S.I. 1993/2559)
 Lincoln Hospitals National Health Service Trust (Establishment) Order 1993 (S.I. 1993/2560)
 Northampton General Hospital National Health Service Trust (Establishment) Order 1993 (S.I. 1993/2561)
 Norwich Community Health Partnership National Health Service Trust (Establishment) Order 1993 (S.I. 1993/2562)
 Nottingham Healthcare National Health Service Trust (Establishment) Order 1993 (S.I. 1993/2563)
 Oxfordshire Ambulance National Health Service Trust (Establishment) Order 1993 (S.I. 1993/2564)
 Oxfordshire Community Health National Health Service Trust (Establishment) Order 1993 (S.I. 1993/2565)
 Oxfordshire Mental Healthcare National Health Service Trust (Establishment) Order 1993 (S.I. 1993/2566)
 Pilgrim Health National Health Service Trust (Establishment) Order 1993 (S.I. 1993/2567)
 Plymouth Hospitals National Health Service Trust (Establishment) Order 1993 (S.I. 1993/2568)
 Portsmouth Health Care National Health Service Trust (Establishment) Order 1993 (S.I. 1993/2569)
 Riverside Community Health Care National Health Service Trust (Establishment) Order 1993 (S.I. 1993/2570)
 Robert Jones and Agnes Hunt Orthopaedic and District Hospital National Health Service Trust (Establishment) Order 1993 (S.I. 1993/2571)
 Rockingham Forest National Health Service Trust (Establishment) Order 1993 (S.I. 1993/2572)
 Royal Shrewsbury Hospitals National Health Service Trust (Establishment) Order 1993 (S.I. 1993/2573)
 Royal Wolverhampton Hospitals National Health Service Trust (Establishment) Order 1993 (S.I. 1993/2574)
 Salisbury Health Care National Health Service Trust (Establishment) Order 1993 (S.I. 1993/2575)
 Solihull Healthcare National Health Service Trust (Establishment) Order 1993 (S.I. 1993/2576)
 Stoke Mandeville Hospital National Health Service Trust (Establishment) Order 1993 (S.I. 1993/2577)
 Wandsworth Community Health National Health Service Trust (Establishment) Order 1993 (S.I. 1993/2578)
 Warwickshire Ambulance Service National Health Service Trust (Establishment) Order 1993 (S.I. 1993/2579)
 South Warwickshire Mental Health National Health Service Trust (Establishment) Order 1993 (S.I. 1993/2580)
 Winchester and Eastleigh Healthcare National Health Service Trust (Establishment) Order 1993 (S.I. 1993/2581)
 Worcester Royal Infirmary National Health Service Trust (Establishment) Order 1993 (S.I. 1993/2582)
 Chichester Priority Care Services National Health Service Trust (Establishment) Order 1993 (S.I. 1993/2589)
 Mental Health Services of Salford National Health Service Trust (Establishment) Order 1993 (S.I. 1993/2590)
 Hartlepool Community Care National Health Service Trust (Establishment) Order 1993 (S.I. 1993/2591)
 Blackburn, Hyndburn and Ribble Valley Health Care National Health Service Trust (Establishment) Order 1993 (S.I. 1993/2592)
 Northumberland Community Health National Health Service Trust (Establishment) Order 1993 (S.I. 1993/2593)
 North Manchester Healthcare National Health Service Trust (Establishment) Order 1993 (S.I. 1993/2594)
 Community Healthcare Bolton National Health Service Trust (Establishment) Order 1993 (S.I. 1993/2595)
 CommuniCare National Health Service Trust (Establishment) Order 1993 (S.I. 1993/2596)
 Blackpool, Wyre and Fylde Community Health Services National Health Service Trust (Establishment) Order 1993 (S.I. 1993/2597)
 Blackpool Victoria Hospital National Health Service Trust (Establishment) Order 1993 (S.I. 1993/2598)
 Bury Health Care National Health Service Trust (Establishment) Order 1993 (S.I. 1993/2599)
 Greater Manchester Ambulance Service National Health Service Trust (Establishment) Order 1993 (S.I. 1993/2600)

2601-2700
 Lancashire Ambulance Service National Health Service Trust (Establishment) Order 1993 (S.I. 1993/2601)
 Tameside and Glossop Acute Services National Health Service Trust (Establishment) Order 1993 (S.I. 1993/2602)
 Darlington Memorial Hospital National Health Service Trust (Establishment) Order 1993 (S.I. 1993/2603)
 Bolton Hospitals National Health Service Trust (Establishment) Order 1993 (S.I. 1993/2604)
 Priority Healthcare Wearside National Health Service Trust (Establishment) Order 1993 (S.I. 1993/2605)
 Community Health Care Service (North Derbyshire) National Health Service Trust (Establishment) Order 1993 (S.I. 1993/2606)
 Wirral Community Healthcare National Health Service Trust (Establishment) Order 1993 (S.I. 1993/2607)
 North Lakeland Healthcare National Health Service Trust (Establishment) Order 1993 (S.I. 1993/2608)
 North Downs Community Health National Health Service Trust (Establishment) Order 1993 (S.I. 1993/2609)
 South Durham Health Care National Health Service Trust (Establishment) Order 1993 (S.I. 1993/2610)
 Salford Community Health Care National Health Service Trust (Establishment) Order 1993 (S.I. 1993/2611)
 Community Health Care: North Durham National Health Service Trust (Establishment) Order 1993 (S.I. 1993/2612)
 Kingston and District Community National Health Service Trust (Establishment) Order 1993 (S.I. 1993/2613)
 North Durham Acute Hospitals National Health Service Trust (Establishment) Order 1993 (S.I. 1993/2614)
 Northampton Community Healthcare National Health Service Trust (Establishment) Order 1993 (S.I. 1993/2615)
 Bishop Auckland Hospitals National Health Service Trust (Establishment) Order 1993 (S.I. 1993/2616)
 Carlisle Hospitals National Health Service Trust (Establishment) Order 1993 (S.I. 1993/2617)
 Cheviot and Wansbeck National Health Service Trust (Establishment) Order 1993 (S.I. 1993/2618)
 City Hospitals Sunderland National Health Service Trust (Establishment) Order 1993 (S.I. 1993/2619)
 West Cheshire National Health Service Trust (Establishment) Order 1993 (S.I. 1993/2620)
 South Kent Community Healthcare National Health Service Trust (Establishment) Order 1993 (S.I. 1993/2621)
 Stockport Acute Services National Health Service Trust (Establishment) Order 1993 (S.I. 1993/2622)
 Guild Community Healthcare National Health Service Trust (Establishment) Order 1993 (S.I. 1993/2623)
 North Tyneside Health Care National Health Service Trust (Establishment) Order 1993 (S.I. 1993/2624)
 Preston Acute Hospitals National Health Service Trust (Establishment) Order 1993 (S.I. 1993/2625)
 Tameside and Glossop Community and Priority Services National Health Service Trust (Establishment) Order 1993 (S.I. 1993/2626)
 Hartlepool and Peterlee Hospitals National Health Service Trust (Establishment) Order 1993 (S.I. 1993/2627)
 Stockport Healthcare National Health Service Trust (Establishment) Order 1993 (S.I. 1993/2628)
 New Possibilities National Health Service Trust (Establishment) Order 1993 (S.I. 1993/2629)
 Shropshire's Community Health Service National Health Service Trust (Establishment) Order 1993 (S.I. 1993/2630)
 Hill Livestock (Compensatory Allowances) Regulations 1993 (S.I. 1993/2631)
 National Lottery etc. Act 1993 (Commencement No. 1 and Transitional Provisions) Order 1993 (S.I. 1993/2632)
 South East London Mental Health National Health Service Trust (Establishment) Order 1993 (S.I. 1993/2633)
 Haringey Health Care National Health Service Trust (Establishment) Order 1993 (S.I. 1993/2634)
 North Staffordshire Combined Healthcare National Health Service Trust (Establishment) Order 1993 (S.I. 1993/2635)
 Lincoln District Healthcare National Health Service Trust (Establishment) Order 1993 (S.I. 1993/2636)
 Swindon and Marlborough National Health Service Trust (Establishment) Order 1993 (S.I. 1993/2637)
 Louth and District Healthcare National Health Service Trust (Establishment) Order 1993 (S.I. 1993/2638)
 North Kent Healthcare National Health Service Trust (Establishment) Order 1993 (S.I. 1993/2639)
 Medway National Health Service Trust (Establishment) Order 1993 (S.I. 1993/2640)
 Queen Victoria Hospital National Health Service Trust (Establishment) Order 1993 (S.I. 1993/2641)
 Dartford and Gravesham National Health Service Trust (Establishment) Order 1993 (S.I. 1993/2642)
 Worthing and Southlands Hospitals National Health Service Trust (Establishment) Order 1993 (S.I. 1993/2643)
 Gipsy Encampments (Borough of Holderness) Order 1993 (S.I. 1993/2644)
 Norfolk Mental Health Care National Health Service Trust (Establishment) Order 1993 (S.I. 1993/2657)
 Private Legislation Procedure (Scotland) General Order 1993 (S.I. 1993/2660)
 European Communities (Designation) (No. 3) Order 1993 (S.I. 1993/2661)
 Birmingham City Council (Grand Union Canal Bridge) Scheme 1991 Confirmation Instrument 1993 (S.I. 1993/2662)
 European Convention on Extradition (Fiscal Offences) Order 1993 (S.I. 1993/2663)
 Admiralty Jurisdiction (Guernsey) Order 1993 (S.I. 1993/2664)
 Agriculture (Northern Ireland) Order 1993 (S.I. 1993/2665)
 Arms Control and Disarmament (Privileges and Immunities) Act 1988 (Guernsey) Order 1993 (S.I. 1993/2666)
 European Convention on Extradition (Hungary and Poland) (Amendment) Order 1993 (S.I. 1993/2667)
 Industrial Relations (Northern Ireland) Order 1993 (S.I. 1993/2668)
 Treaty on Open Skies (Privileges and Immunities) (Guernsey) Order 1993 (S.I. 1993/2669)
 Air Navigation (Fifth Amendment) Order 1993 (S.I. 1993/2670)
 Birmingham Heartlands Hospital National Health Service Trust (Transfer of Trust Property) Order 1993 (S.I. 1993/2680)
 Croydon Community National Health Service Trust (Transfer of Trust Property) Order 1993 (S.I. 1993/2681)
 Herefordshire Community Health National Health Service Trust (Transfer of Trust Property) Order 1993 (S.I. 1993/2682)
 Princess Royal Hospital National Health Service Trust (Transfer of Trust Property) Order 1993 (S.I. 1993/2683)
 Ravensbourne Priority Health National Health Service Trust (Transfer of Trust Property) Order 1993 (S.I. 1993/2684)
 St. Helier National Health Service Trust (Transfer of Trust Property) Order 1993 (S.I. 1993/2685)
 Walsgrave Hospitals National Health Service Trust (Transfer of Trust Property) Order 1993 (S.I. 1993/2686)
 Industrial Tribunals (Constitution and Rules of Procedure) Regulations 1993 (S.I. 1993/2687)
 Industrial Tribunals (Constitution and Rules of Procedure) (Scotland) Regulations 1993 (S.I. 1993/2688)
 Disclosure of Interests in Shares (Amendment) (No. 2) Regulations 1993 (S.I. 1993/2689)
 Prior Rights of Surviving Spouse (Scotland) S.I. 1993/2690)
 Central Manchester National Health Service Trust (Transfer of Trust Property) Order 1993 (S.I. 1993/2691)
 Lancaster Acute Hospitals National Health Service Trust (Transfer of Trust Property) Order 1993 (S.I. 1993/2692)
 Lancaster Priority Services National Health Service Trust (Transfer of Trust Property) Order 1993 (S.I. 1993/2693)
 Lifecare National Health Service Trust (Transfer of Trust Property) Order 1993 (S.I. 1993/2694)
 Lifespan Health Care Cambridge National Health Service Trust (Transfer of Trust Property) Order 1993 (S.I. 1993/2695)
 Lincolnshire Ambulance and Health Transport Service National Health Service Trust (Transfer of Trust Property) Order 1993 (S.I. 1993/2696)
 Mayday Healthcare National Health Service Trust (Transfer of Trust Property) Order 1993 (S.I. 1993/2697)
 Weights and Measures Act 1985 Commencement (Revocation) Order 1993 (S.I. 1993/2698)

2701-2800
 Social Security (Introduction of Disability Living Allowance) (Amendment) (No. 3) Regulations 1993 (S.I. 1993/2704)
 Capital Allowances (Corresponding Northern Ireland Grants) Order 1993 (S.I. 1993/2705)
 Building Societies (Designation of Qualifying Bodies) (No. 3) Order 1993 (S.I. 1993/2706)
 Education (No. 2) Act 1986 (Amendment) Order 1993 (S.I. 1993/2709)
 Housing Renovation etc. Grants (Grant Limit) (Amendment) Order 1993 (S.I. 1993/2711)
 Reconstitution of the River Ouzel Internal Drainage Board Order 1993 (S.I. 1993/2712)
 Placing on the Market and Supervision of Transfers of Explosives Regulations 1993 (S.I. 1993/2714)
 Food Labelling (Scotland) Amendment Regulations 1993 (S.I. 1993/2731)
 Teachers (Education, Training and Recommendation for Registration) (Scotland) Regulations 1993 (S.I. 1993/2732)
 Portsmouth Mile End Quay (Berth No. 2 Extension) Harbour Revision Order 1993 (S.I. 1993/2733)
 Criminal Justice Act 1993 (Commencement No. 3) Order 1993 (S.I. 1993/2734)
 Social Security (Contributions) (Miscellaneous Amendments) Regulations 1993 (S.I. 1993/2736)
 Public Service Vehicles (Registration of Local Services) (Amendment) Regulations 1993 (S.I. 1993/2752)
 Public Service Vehicles (Operators' Licences) (Amendment) Regulations 1993 (S.I. 1993/2753)
 Public Service Vehicles (Traffic Commissioners: Publication and Inquiries) (Amendment) Regulations 1993 (S.I. 1993/2754)
 Copyright (Certification of Licensing Scheme for Educational Recording of Broadcasts) (Open University Educational Enterprises Limited) Order 1993 (S.I. 1993/2755)
 Housing (Right to Buy) (Priority of Charges) (No. 2) Order 1993 (S.I. 1993/2757)
 Mortgage Indemnities (Recognised Bodies) (No.2) Order 1993 (S.I. 1993/2758)
 Food Labelling (Amendment) Regulations 1993 (S.I. 1993/2759)
 Rules of the Supreme Court (Amendment No. 2) 1993 (S.I. 1993/2760)
 Northern Ireland (Emergency Provisions) Act 1991 (Codes of Practice) (No. 1) Order 1993 (S.I. 1993/2761)
 Leasehold Reform, Housing and Urban Development Act 1993 (Commencement and Transitional Provisions No. 3) Order 1993 (S.I. 1993/2762)
 Environmentally Sensitive Areas (Central Borders) Designation Order 1993 (S.I. 1993/2767)
 Environmentally Sensitive Areas (Stewartry) Designation Order 1993 (S.I. 1993/2768)
 Charities (Designated Religious Bodies) (Scotland) Order 1993 (S.I. 1993/2774)
 Plant Breeders' Rights (Amendment) Regulations 1993 (S.I. 1993/2775)
 Plant Breeders' Rights (Trees, Shrubs and Woody Climbers) Scheme 1993 (S.I. 1993/2776)
 Plant Breeders' Rights (Tomatoes) Scheme 1993 (S.I. 1993/2777)
 Plant Breeders' Rights (Miscellaneous Ornamental Plants) (Variation) Scheme 1993 (S.I. 1993/2778)
 Plant Breeders' Rights (Sainfoin and Birdsfoot Trefoil) Scheme 1993 (S.I. 1993/2779)
 Plant Breeders' Rights (Herbaceous Perennials) (Variation) Scheme 1993 (S.I. 1993/2780)
 Plant Breeders' Rights (Quince Rootstocks) Scheme 1993 (S.I. 1993/2781)
 Finance Act 1993 (Appointed Day No. 2) Order 1993 (S.I. 1993/2782)
 Local Government Superannuation (South Yorkshire Transport Limited) Regulations 1993 (S.I. 1993/2783)
 Northern Ireland (Emergency Provisions) Act 1991 (Codes of Practice) (No. 2) Order 1993 (S.I. 1993/2788)
 County Court Appeals (Amendment) (Transitional Provisions) Order 1993 (S.I. 1993/2789)
 Transport Act 1985 (Modifications in Schedule 4 to the Transport Act 1968) (Further Modification) Order 1993 (S.I. 1993/2797)
 Sex Discrimination and Equal Pay (Remedies) Regulations 1993 (S.I. 1993/2798)
 Home Energy Efficiency Grants (Amendment) Regulations 1993 (S.I. 1993/2799)

2801-2900
 Scottish Electricity Boards (Dissolution) Order 1993 (S.I. 1993/2802)
 Road Traffic Act 1991 (Commencement No. 8 and Transitional Provisions) Order 1993 (S.I. 1993/2803)
 Road Traffic (Special Parking Areas) (London Boroughs of Camden, Hackney and Hounslow) Order 1993 (S.I. 1993/2804)
 Meldon Quarry Branch Line Order 1993 (S.I. 1993/2805)
 Foreign Compensation (Financial Provisions) (No. 2) Order 1993 (S.I. 1993/2806)
 Libya (United Nations Sanctions) Order 1993 (S.I. 1993/2807)
 Libya (United Nations Sanctions) (Dependent Territories) Order 1993 (S.I. 1993/2808)
 State Immunity (Federal States) Order 1993 (S.I. 1993/2809)
 Education and Libraries (Northern Ireland) Order 1993 (S.I. 1993/2810)
 Libya (United Nations Sanctions) (Channel Islands) Order 1993 (S.I. 1993/2811)
 Libya (United Nations Sanctions) (Isle of Man) Order 1993 (S.I. 1993/2812)
 Local Government Act 1988 (Defined Activities) (Exemption) (Wales) Order 1993 (S.I. 1993/2813)
 British Railways (Penalty Fares) Act 1989 (Activating No. 11) Order 1993 (S.I. 1993/2814)
 Central Manchester National Health Service Trust (Change of Name) Order 1993 (S.I. 1993/2815)
 Cleveland Ambulance National Health Service Trust (Establishment) Amendment Order 1993 (S.I. 1993/2816)
 Education (School Information) (Amendment) (England) Regulations 1993 (S.I. 1993/2824)
 Area Boards (Dissolution) Order 1993 (S.I. 1993/2825)
 Collecting Societies (Returns) Regulations 1993 (S.I. 1993/2826)
 Education (No. 2) Act 1986 (Amendment) (No. 2) Order 1993 (S.I. 1993/2827)
 Education (Recognised Awards) (Richmond College) Order 1993 (S.I. 1993/2828)
 Finance Act 1993, section 211, (Appointed Day) Order 1993 (S.I. 1993/2831)
 A61 Trunk Road (Sheffield to Westwood Roundabout) (Detrunking) Order 1993 (S.I. 1993/2832)
 Building Societies (Aggregation) Rules 1993 (S.I. 1993/2833)
 Mid Glamorgan Ambulance National Health Service Trust (Establishment) Order 1993 (S.I. 1993/2834)
 Derwen National Health Service Trust (Establishment) Order 1993 (S.I. 1993/2835)
 North Wales Ambulance National Health Service Trust (Establishment) Order 1993 (S.I. 1993/2836)
 Rhondda Health Care National Health Service Trust (Establishment) Order 1993 (S.I. 1993/2837)
 Velindre National Health Service Trust (Establishment) Order 1993 (S.I. 1993/2838)
 Gwynedd Community Health National Health Service Trust (Establishment) Order 1993 (S.I. 1993/2839)
 Nevill Hall and District National Health Service Trust (Establishment) Order 1993 (S.I. 1993/2840)
 Gwynedd Hospitals National Health Service Trust (Establishment) Order 1993 (S.I. 1993/2841)
 Finance Act 1993, Chapter II, (Appointed Day) Order 1993 (S.I. 1993/2842)
 Payments to Redundant Churches Fund Order 1993 (S.I. 1993/2846)
 Ordination of Women (Financial Provisions) (Appeals) Rules 1993 (S.I. 1993/2847)
 East Anglian Ambulance National Health Service Trust (Establishment) Order 1993 (S.I. 1993/2848)
 Norfolk Ambulance National Health Service Trust Dissolution Order 1993 (S.I. 1993/2849)
 Combined Probation Areas (Cumbria) Order 1993 (S.I. 1993/2852)
 Combined Probation Areas (Greater Manchester) Order 1993 (S.I. 1993/2853)
 Employment Appeal Tribunal Rules 1993 (S.I. 1993/2854)
 Birmingham City Council (Grand Union Canal Bridge) Scheme 1992 Confirmation Instrument 1993 (S.I. 1993/2855)
 Mid Essex Community and Mental Health National Health Service Trust (Establishment) Order 1993 (S.I. 1993/2856)
 Wigan and Leigh Health Services National Health Service Trust (Transfer of Trust Property) Order 1993 (S.I. 1993/2857)
 Public Airport Companies (Capital Finance) (Fourth Amendment) Order 1993 (S.I. 1993/2875)
 Conservation of Seals (England) Order 1993 (S.I. 1993/2876)
 Motor Vehicles Tyres (Safety) (Amendment) Regulations 1993 (S.I. 1993/2877)
 Local Government Reorganisation (Capital Money) (Greater London) (Amendment) Order 1993 (S.I. 1993/2878)
 Redbridge and Waltham Forest (London Borough Boundaries) Order 1993 (S.I. 1993/2881)
 Local Government (Compensation for Premature Retirement) (Amendment) Regulations 1993 (S.I. 1993/2890)
 Local Government Act 1988 (Defined Activities) (Exemption) (Wales) (No. 2) Order 1993 (S.I. 1993/2894)
 Protection of Wrecks (Designation No. 3) Order 1993 (S.I. 1993/2895)
 Community Health Sheffield National Health Service Trust (Establishment) Order 1993 (S.I. 1993/2896)
 Public Telecommunication System Designation (Scottish Power Telecommunications Limited) Order 1993 (S.I. 1993/2897)
 Public Telecommunication System Designation (Torch Communications Limited) Order 1993 (S.I. 1993/2898)
 Public Telecommunication System Designation (MFS Communications Limited) Order 1993 (S.I. 1993/2899)
 Farm and Conservation Grant (Amendment) Regulations 1993 (S.I. 1993/2900)

2901-3000
 Farm and Conservation Grant (Variation) Scheme 1993 (S.I. 1993/2901)
 Medicines (Pharmacies) (Applications for Registration and Fees) Amendment Regulations 1993 (S.I. 1993/2902)
 Motor Vehicles (Type Approval and Approval Marks) (Fees) (Amendment) Regulations 1993 (S.I. 1993/2903)
 Occupational Pensions (Revaluation) Order 1993 (S.I. 1993/2904)
 Family Provision (Intestate Succession) Order 1993 (S.I. 1993/2906)
 Western Isles Islands Council (Brevig) Harbour Empowerment Order 1993 (S.I. 1993/2908)
 Transport Act 1985 (Modifications in Schedule 4 to the Transport Act 1968) (Further Modification) (Amendment) Order 1993 (S.I. 1993/2909)
 Education (Mandatory Awards) (No. 2) Regulations 1993 (S.I. 1993/2914)
 Education (Student Loans) (No.2) Regulations 1993 (S.I. 1993/2915)
 Forth Ports Authority (Dissolution) Order 1993 (S.I. 1993/2916)
 A43 Trunk Road (Weldon Bypass) Order 1993 (S.I. 1993/2917)
 A43 Trunk Road (Stamford Road, Northamptonshire) (Detrunking) Order 1993 (S.I. 1993/2918)
 Firearms (Amendment) Act 1988 (Firearms Consultative Committee) Order 1993 (S.I. 1993/2919)
 Bovine Embryo Collection and Transfer (Fees) Regulations 1993 (S.I. 1993/2920)
 Bovine Embryo Collection and Transfer Regulations 1993 (S.I. 1993/2921)
 Consumer Credit (Exempt Agreements) (Amendment) (No. 2) Order 1993 (S.I. 1993/2922)
 Imitation Dummies (Safety) Regulations 1993 (S.I. 1993/2923)
 Hill Livestock (Compensatory Allowances) (Amendment) (No. 2) Regulations 1993 (S.I. 1993/2924)
 Social Security (Contributions) Amendment (No. 7) Regulations 1993 (S.I. 1993/2925)
 Dundee Healthcare National Health Service Trust (Establishment) Order 1993 (S.I. 1993/2926)
 Falkirk and District Royal Infirmary National Health Service Trust (Establishment) Order 1993 (S.I. 1993/2927)
 Hairmyres and Stonehouse Hospitals National Health Service Trust (Establishment) Order 1993 (S.I. 1993/2928)
 Law Hospital National Health Service Trust (Establishment) Order 1993 (S.I. 1993/2929)
 Perth and Kinross Healthcare National Health Service Trust (Establishment) Order 1993 (S.I. 1993/2930)
 East and Midlothian National Health Service Trust (Establishment) Order 1993 (S.I. 1993/2931)
 Royal Infirmary of Edinburgh National Health Service Trust (Establishment) Order 1993 (S.I. 1993/2932)
 Western General Hospitals National Health Service Trust (Establishment) Order 1993 (S.I. 1993/2933)
 Dumfries and Galloway Acute and Maternity Hospitals National Health Service Trust (Establishment) Order 1993 (S.I. 1993/2934)
 Glasgow Community and Mental Health Services National Health Service Trust (Establishment) Order 1993 (S.I. 1993/2935)
 Edinburgh Sick Children's National Health Service Trust (Establishment) Order 1993 (S.I. 1993/2936)
 Fife Healthcare National Health Service Trust (Establishment) Order 1993 (S.I. 1993/2937)
 Edinburgh Healthcare National Health Service Trust (Establishment) Order 1993 (S.I. 1993/2938)
 Petroleum Revenue Tax (Nomination Scheme for Disposals and Appropriations) (Amendment) Regulations 1993 (S.I. 1993/2939)
 A604(M) Motorway (Alconbury to A1(M) Section) And Connecting Roads Scheme 1993 (S.I. 1993/2940)
 A604 Trunk Road (Alconbury to A1 Improvement) (Detrunking) Order 1993 (S.I. 1993/2941)
 A604 Trunk Road (Alconbury to A1 Improvement and Slip Roads) Order 1993 (S.I. 1993/2942)
 A1 Trunk Road (Alconbury to Fletton Parkway Improvement and Slip Roads) Order 1993 (S.I. 1993/2943)
 A1(M) Motorway (Alconbury to Fletton Parkway Section) and Connecting Roads Scheme 1993 (S.I. 1993/2944)
 A1 Trunk Road (Alconbury to Fletton Parkway Improvement) (Detrunking) Order 1993 (S.I. 1993/2945)
 Fire Services (Appointments and Promotion) (Amendment) Regulations 1993 (S.I. 1993/2946)
 Capital Gains Tax (Annual Exempt Amount) (No. 2) Order 1993 (S.I. 1993/2947)
 Income Tax (Indexation) (No. 2) Order 1993 (S.I. 1993/2948)
 Inheritance Tax (Indexation) (No. 2) Order 1993 (S.I. 1993/2949)
 Retirement Benefits Schemes (Indexation of Earnings Cap) (No. 2) Order 1993 (S.I. 1993/2950)
 Value Added Tax (Cars) (Amendment) Order 1993 (S.I. 1993/2951)
 Value Added Tax (Increase of Consideration for Fuel) (No. 2) Order 1993 (S.I. 1993/2952)
 Value Added Tax (Increase of Registration Limits) (No. 2) Order 1993 (S.I. 1993/2953)
 Value Added Tax (Input Tax) (Amendment) Order 1993 (S.I. 1993/2954)
 London–Holyhead Trunk Road (Corwen and Pont Corwen to Pont Melin–Rug Diversions, Variation) Order 1993 (S.I. 1993/2955)
 Animals (Scientific Procedures) Act (Fees) Order 1993 (S.I. 1993/2956)
 Sheriff Court Fees Amendment (No.2) Order 1993 (S.I. 1993/2957)
 A10 Trunk Road (Wadesmill, High Cross and Colliers End Bypass and Slip Road) Order 1993 (S.I. 1993/2963)
 A10 Trunk Road (North of Ware to South of Puckeridge) (Detrunking) Order 1993 (S.I. 1993/2964)
 Education (School Inspection) (Wales) (No. 2) (Amendment) Regulations 1993 (S.I. 1993/2968)
 Scottish College of Textiles (Scotland) Order of Council 1993 (S.I. 1993/2969)
 Civil Aviation (Route Charges for Navigation Services) (Amendment) Regulations 1993 (S.I. 1993/2970)
 Hereford and Worcester and West Midlands (County Boundaries) Order 1993 (S.I. 1993/2971)
 National Health Service (Service Committees and Tribunal) Amendment Regulations 1993 (S.I. 1993/2972)
 Education (School Inspection) (No. 2) (Amendment) Regulations 1993 (S.I. 1993/2973)
 Port of Bristol Harbour Revision Order 1993 (S.I. 1993/2974)
 Civil Aviation (Joint Financing) (Fifth Amendment) Regulations 1993 (S.I. 1993/2975)
 Gipsy Encampments (East Yorkshire Borough of Beverley) Order 1993 (S.I. 1993/2980)

3001-3100
 Motor Vehicles (Tests) (Amendment) Regulations 1993 (S.I. 1993/3011)
 Public Service Vehicles (Conditions of Fitness, Equipment, Use and Certification) (Amendment) Regulations 1993 (S.I. 1993/3012)
 Goods Vehicles (Plating and Testing) (Amendment) (No. 2) Regulations 1993 (S.I. 1993/3013)
 Community Customs Code (Consequential Amendment of References) Regulations 1993 (S.I. 1993/3014)
 Statistics of Trade (Customs and Excise) (Amendment No. 2) Regulations 1993 (S.I. 1993/3015)
 Retirement Benefits Schemes (Restriction on Discretion to Approve) (Additional Voluntary Contributions) Regulations 1993 (S.I. 1993/3016)
 Advice and Assistance (Scotland) (Prospective Cost) Revocation Regulations 1993 (S.I. 1993/3017)
 Inverclyde Royal National Health Service Trust (Establishment) Order 1993 (S.I. 1993/3018)
 Kirkcaldy Acute Hospitals National Health Service Trust (Establishment) Order 1993 (S.I. 1993/3019)
 Queen Margaret Hospital National Health Service Trust (Establishment) Order 1993 (S.I. 1993/3020)
 Stobhill National Health Service Trust (Establishment) Order 1993 (S.I. 1993/3021)
 Angus National Health Service Trust (Establishment) Order 1993 (S.I. 1993/3022)
 Glasgow Royal Infirmary University National Health Service Trust (Establishment) Order 1993 (S.I. 1993/3023)
 Renfrewshire Healthcare National Health Service Trust (Establishment) Order 1993 (S.I. 1993/3024)
 West Glasgow Hospitals University National Health Service Trust (Establishment) Order 1993 (S.I. 1993/3025)
 Highland Communities National Health Service Trust (Establishment) Order 1993 (S.I. 1993/3026)
 Value Added Tax (General) (Amendment) (No.7) Regulations 1993 (S.I. 1993/3027)
 Value Added Tax (Cash Accounting) (Amendment) (No. 2) Regulations 1993 (S.I. 1993/3028)
 Trade Marks and Service Marks (Fees) (Amendment) Rules 1993 (S.I. 1993/3029)
 Local Government Superannuation (Educational Institutions) Regulations 1993 (S.I. 1993/3030)
 Transfrontier Shipment of Radioactive Waste Regulations 1993 (S.I. 1993/3031)
 Gipsy Encampments (Metropolitan District of Salford) Order 1993 (S.I. 1993/3032)
 A564 Trunk Road Stoke—Derby Route (Doveridge Bypass and Slip Roads) Order 1993 (S.I. 1993/3033)
 A564 Trunk Road Stoke—Derby Route (Doveridge Bypass) (Detrunking) Order 1993 (S.I. 1993/3034)
 Local Government Act 1988 (Defined Activities) (Exemption) (Cambridge City Council) Order 1993 (S.I. 1993/3035)
 Sheep Annual Premium and Suckler Cow Premium Quotas (Amendment) Regulations 1993 (S.I. 1993/3036)
 Census of Production Order 1993 (S.I. 1993/3037)
 Licensing of Air Carriers (Second Amendment and Other Provisions) Regulations 1993 (S.I. 1993/3039)
 Access for Community Air Carriers to Intra-Community Air Routes (Amendment and Other Provisions) Regulations 1993 (S.I. 1993/3040)
 Air Fares (Second Amendment) Regulations 1993 (S.I. 1993/3041)
 Airports Slot Allocation (Amendment) Regulations 1993 (S.I. 1993/3042)
 Local Government Superannuation (Membership) Regulations 1993 (S.I. 1993/3043)
 Local Government Superannuation (Scotland) Amendment (No.3) Regulations 1993 (S.I. 1993/3044)
 Land Registration (Leasehold Reform) Rules 1993 (S.I. 1993/3045)
 Broadcasting (Prescribed Countries) (Amendment) Order 1993 (S.I. 1993/3046)
 Broadcasting (Foreign Satellite Programmes) (Specified Countries) (Amendment) Order 1993 (S.I. 1993/3047)
 Road Vehicles (Construction and Use) (Amendment) (No. 3) Regulations 1993 (S.I. 1993/3048)
 Public Lending Right Scheme 1982 (Commencement of Variation) Order 1993 (S.I. 1993/3049)
 Notification of New Substances Regulations 1993 (S.I. 1993/3050)
 Hearing Aid Council Monetary Penalty (Increase) Order 1993 (S.I. 1993/3052)
 Commercial Agents (Council Directive) Regulations 1993 (S.I. 1993/3053)
 Local Authorities (Capital Finance) (Amendment) (No. 3) Regulations 1993 (S.I. 1993/3054)
 Income Tax (Interest Relief) (Qualifying Lenders) (No. 4) Order 1993 (S.I. 1993/3055)
 Education (University Commissioners) Order 1993 (S.I. 1993/3056)
 National Health Service Trusts (Consultation on Dissolution) (Scotland) Regulations 1993 (S.I. 1993/3057)
 Food Protection (Emergency Prohibitions) (Oil and Chemical Pollution of Fish) (No.2) (Partial Revocation No.2) Order 1993 (S.I. 1993/3058)
 Non-Domestic Rating Contributions (Scotland) Amendment Regulations 1993 (S.I. 1993/3059)
 New Town (Livingston) Winding Up Order 1993 (S.I. 1993/3060)
 New Town (Irvine) Winding Up Order 1993 (S.I. 1993/3061)
 New Town (Cumbernauld) Winding Up Order 1993 (S.I. 1993/3062)
 Herring (Specified Sea Areas) (Prohibition of Fishing) Order 1993 (S.I. 1993/3063)
 Passenger and Goods Vehicles (Recording Equipment) (Approval of Fitters and Workshops) (Fees) (Amendment) Regulations 1993 (S.I. 1993/3066)
 International Carriage of Dangerous Goods by Road (Fees) (Amendment) Regulations 1993 (S.I. 1993/3067)
 International Transport of Goods under Cover of TIR Carnets (Fees) (Amendment) Regulations 1993 (S.I. 1993/3068)
 Children (Homes, Arrangements for Placement, Reviews and Representations) (Miscellaneous Amendments) Regulations 1993 (S.I. 1993/3069)
 Education (Publication of Schemes for Financing Schools) Regulations 1993 (S.I. 1993/3070)
 Common Agricultural Policy (Wine) (Amendment) Regulations 1993 (S.I. 1993/3071)
 Education (Acquisition of Grant–maintained Status) (Transitional Functions) Regulations 1993 (S.I. 1993/3072)
 Education (Grant–maintained Schools) (Loans) Regulations 1993 (S.I. 1993/3073)
 Personal Protective Equipment (EC Directive) (Amendment) Regulations 1993 (S.I. 1993/3074)
 Prison (Amendment) (No. 2) Rules 1993 (S.I. 1993/3075)
 Young Offender Institution (Amendment) Rules 1993 (S.I. 1993/3076)
 Non–Domestic Rating Contributions (Wales) (Amendment) (No. 2) Regulations 1993 (S.I. 1993/3077)
 A1 Trunk Road (Holloway Road, Islington) (Prescribed Routes) Order 1993 (S.I. 1993/3078)
 Fire Services (Appointments and Promotion) (Scotland) Amendment Regulations 1993 (S.I. 1993/3079)
 Act of Sederunt (Fees of Solicitors in the Sheriff Court) (Amendment and Further Provisions) 1993 (S.I. 1993/3080)
 Police (Scotland) Amendment Regulations 1993 (S.I. 1993/3081)
 Non-Domestic Rating Contributions (England) (Amendment) (No. 2) Regulations 1993 (S.I. 1993/3082)
 Boiler (Efficiency) Regulations 1993 (S.I. 1993/3083)
 Friendly Societies Act 1992 (Transitional and Consequential Provisions) Regulations 1993 (S.I. 1993/3084)
 Welfare of Animals at Markets (Amendment) Order 1993 (S.I. 1993/3085)
 Diseases of Animals (Approved Disinfectants) (Amendment) (No. 2) Order 1993 (S.I. 1993/3086)
 Civil Aviation (Route Charges for Navigation Services) (Second Amendment) Regulations 1993 (S.I. 1993/3098)
 Credit Unions (Authorised Investments) Order 1993 (S.I. 1993/3100)

3101-3200
 Education (Schools Conducted by Education Associations) (Initial Articles of Government) Regulations 1993 (S.I. 1993/3101)
 Education (Grant-maintained Schools) (Initial Governing Instruments) Regulations 1993 (S.I. 1993/3102)
 Education (Schools Conducted by Education Associations) Regulations 1993 (S.I. 1993/3103)
 Education (Application of Financing Schemes to Special Schools) Regulations 1993 (S.I. 1993/3104)
 Education (School Curriculum and Assessment Authority) (Orders for Transfer of Property and Staff) Order 1993 (S.I. 1993/3105)
 Education Act 1993 (Commencement No. 2 and Transitional Provisions) Order 1993 (S.I. 1993/3106)
 Education (School Government) (Amendment) Regulations 1993 (S.I. 1993/3107)
 Local Government (Compensation for Premature Retirement) (Amendment) (No. 2) Regulations 1993 (S.I. 1993/3108)
 Insurance Companies (Pension Business) (Transitional Provisions) (Amendment) Regulations 1993 (S.I. 1993/3109)
 Stamp Duty Reserve Tax (Amendment) Regulations 1993 (S.I. 1993/3110)
 Friendly Societies (Modification of the Corporation Tax Acts) (Amendment) Regulations 1993 (S.I. 1993/3111)
 Friendly Societies (Provisional Repayments for Exempt Business) Regulations 1993 (S.I. 1993/3112)
 Education (Publication of School Proposals and Notices) Regulations 1993 (S.I. 1993/3113)
 Education Assets Board (Transfers under the Education Reform Act 1988) (Amendment) Regulations 1993 (S.I. 1993/3114)
 Education (Annual Consideration of Ballot on Grant-Maintained Status) (England) Order 1993 (S.I. 1993/3115)
 Registration of Births, Deaths and Marriages (Fees) Order 1993 (S.I. 1993/3116)
 Vocational Training (Tax Relief) (Amendment No. 2) Regulations 1993 (S.I. 1993/3118)
 Foot–and–Mouth Disease (Amendment) (No. 2) Order 1993 (S.I. 1993/3119)
 Civil Courts (Amendment No. 2) Order 1993 (S.I. 1993/3120)
 Income Support (General) Amendment (No. 4) Regulations 1993 (S.I. 1993/3121)
 Appointment of Judges as Arbiters (Fees) (Scotland) Order 1993 (S.I. 1993/3125)
 Insurance Companies (Switzerland) Regulations 1993 (S.I. 1993/3127)
 Act of Sederunt (Summary Suspension) 1993 (S.I. 1993/3128)
 Durham and Tyne and Wear (County and District Boundaries) (Variation) Order 1993 (S.I. 1993/3129)
 National Savings Bank (Amendment) Regulations 1993 (S.I. 1993/3130)
 National Savings Stock Register (Amendment) (No. 2) Regulations 1993 (S.I. 1993/3131)
 Savings Certificates (Yearly Plan) (Amendment) Regulations 1993 (S.I. 1993/3132)
 Savings Certificates (Amendment) Regulations 1993 (S.I. 1993/3133)
 Severn Bridges Tolls Order 1993 (S.I. 1993/3135)
 Environmentally Sensitive Areas (Argyll Islands) Designation Order 1993 (S.I. 1993/3136)
 Merchant Shipping (Registration, etc.) Act 1993 (Commencement No. 1 and Transitional Provisions) Order 1993 (S.I. 1993/3137)
 Merchant Shipping (Registration of Ships) Regulations 1993 (S.I. 1993/3138)
 Combined Probation Areas (Suffolk) Order 1993 (S.I. 1993/3139)
 Mid Essex Community Health National Health Service Trust Dissolution Order 1993 (S.I. 1993/3140)
 New Possibilities National Health Service Trust Dissolution Order 1993 (S.I. 1993/3141)
 Combined Probation Areas (Kent) Order 1993 (S.I. 1993/3142)
 Cayman Islands (Constitution) (Amendment) Order 1993 (S.I. 1993/3143)
 Child Abduction and Custody (Parties to Conventions) Order 1993 (S.I. 1993/3144)
 Hong Kong (Legislative Powers) (Amendment) Order 1993 (S.I. 1993/3145)
 Criminal Justice (Confiscation) (Northern Ireland) Order 1993 (S.I. 1993/3146)
 Criminal Justice Act 1988 (Designated Countries and Territories) (Amendment) (No. 2) Order 1993 (S.I. 1993/3147)
 Criminal Justice (International Co–operation) Act 1990 (Enforcement of Overseas Forfeiture Orders) (Amendment) (No. 2) Order 1993 (S.I. 1993/3148)
 Environmentally Sensitive Areas (Machair of the Uists and Benbecula, Barra and Vatersay) Designation Order 1993 (S.I. 1993/3149)
 Environmentally Sensitive Areas (Shetland Islands) Designation Order 1993 (S.I. 1993/3150)
 Registration of Births, Deaths and Marriages (Fees) (Scotland) Order 1993 (S.I. 1993/3151)
 Marriage Fees (Scotland) Regulations 1993 (S.I. 1993/3152)
 Registration of Births, Deaths, Marriages and Divorces (Fees) (Scotland) Regulations 1993 (S.I. 1993/3153)
 Maximum Number of Judges (Scotland) Order 1993 (S.I. 1993/3154)
 Criminal Justice (International Co-operation) Act 1990 (Enforcement of Overseas Forfeiture Orders) (Scotland) Amendment (No.2) Order 1993 (S.I. 1993/3155)
 Confiscation of the Proceeds of Drug Trafficking (Designated Countries and Territories) (Scotland) Amendment (No.2) Order 1993 (S.I. 1993/3156)
 European Communities (Definition of Treaties) (European Investment Fund) Order 1993 (S.I. 1993/3157)
 Drug Trafficking Offences Act 1986 (Designated Countries and Territories) (Amendment) (No. 2) Order 1993 (S.I. 1993/3158)
 Environment and Safety Information (Northern Ireland) Order 1993 (S.I. 1993/3159)
 Roads (Northern Ireland) Order 1993 (S.I. 1993/3160)
 Merchant Shipping (Fire Protection) (Non-United Kingdom) (Non-SOLAS Ships) (Amendment) Rules 1993 (S.I. 1993/3161)
 Merchant Shipping (Fire Appliances) (Amendment) Regulations 1993 (S.I. 1993/3162)
 Merchant Shipping (Fire Protection) (Amendment) Regulations 1993 (S.I. 1993/3163)
 Merchant Shipping (Fire Protection) (Ships Built Before 25 May 1980) (Amendment) Regulations 1993 (S.I. 1993/3164)
 Water and Sewerage Services (Amendment) (Northern Ireland) Order 1993 (S.I. 1993/3165)
 Ministerial and other Salaries Order 1993 (S.I. 1993/3166)
 Redundancy Payments (National Health Service) (Modification) Order 1993 (S.I. 1993/3167)
 Finance Act 1985 (Interest on Tax) (Prescribed Rate) (No. 2) Order 1993 (S.I. 1993/3168)
 Local Government Act 1992 (Commencement No. 3) Order 1993 (S.I. 1993/3169)
 Town and Country Planning (Fees for Applications and Deemed Applications) (Amendment) Regulations 1993 (S.I. 1993/3170)
 Taxes (Interest Rate) (Amendment No. 4) Regulations 1993 (S.I. 1993/3171)
 National Health Service (General Dental Services) Amendment (No. 2) Regulations 1993 (S.I. 1993/3172)
 Commercial Agents (Council Directive) (Amendment) Regulations 1993 (S.I. 1993/3173)
 Education (Individual Pupils' Achievements) (Information) Regulations 1993 (S.I. 1993/3182)
 Education (European Economic Area) (Amendment) Regulations 1993 (S.I. 1993/3183)
 Education (European Economic Area) (Scotland) Regulations 1993 (S.I. 1993/3184)
 Liquor Licensing (Fees) (Scotland) Order 1993 (S.I. 1993/3185)
 Advice and Assistance (Assistance by Way of Representation) (Scotland) Amendment (No. 2) Regulations 1993 (S.I. 1993/3186)
 Advice and Assistance (Financial Limit) (Scotland) Regulations 1993 (S.I. 1993/3187)
 Education (Grant–maintained Schools) (Initial Sponsor Governors) Regulations 1993 (S.I. 1993/3188)
 Education (Acquisition of Grant-maintained Status) (Ballot Information) Regulations 1993 (S.I. 1993/3189)
 Supreme Court Fees (Amendment) Order 1993 (S.I. 1993/3191)
 Cod and Saithe (Specified Sea Areas) (Prohibition of Fishing) Order 1993 (S.I. 1993/3192)
 Haddock, Hake, Nephrops, Plaice and Sole (Specified Sea Areas) (Prohibition of Fishing) Order 1993 (S.I. 1993/3193)
 Social Security (Severe Disablement Allowance) Amendment Regulations 1993 (S.I. 1993/3194)
 Doncaster Borough Council (North Bridge Relief Road) (Crossing of Navigable Waterway (Sheffield and South Yorkshire Navigation River Don New Cut)) Scheme 1991 Confirmation Instrument 1993 (S.I. 1993/3195)
 Education (Distribution by Schools of Information about Further Education Institutions) (England) Regulations 1993 (S.I. 1993/3197)
 Nitrate Sensitive Areas (Designation) (Amendment) Order 1993 (S.I. 1993/3198)
 Broadcasting (Restrictions on the Holding of Licences) (Amendment) Order 1993 (S.I. 1993/3199)

3201-3300
 A3 Trunk Road (Robin Hood Way (South) Service Road, Kingston upon Thames) (Prescribed Routes) Order 1993 (S.I. 1993/3201)
 Town and Country Planning (Fees for Applications and Deemed Applications) (Scotland) Amendment Regulations 1993 (S.I. 1993/3211)
 Lottery Duty Regulations 1993 (S.I. 1993/3212)
 Plant Health (Great Britain) (Amendment) (Potatoes) Order 1993 (S.I. 1993/3213)
 Upper Spey and Associated Waters Protection (Renewal) Order 1993 (S.I. 1993/3216)
 A6 Trunk Road (Rushden and Higham Ferrers Bypass) Order 1993 (S.I. 1993/3217)
 A6 Trunk Road (Rushden and Higham Ferrers Bypass) (Detrunking) Order 1993 (S.I. 1993/3218)
 Occupational Pension Schemes (Transitional Provisions) (Amendment) Regulations 1993 (S.I. 1993/3219)
 Retirement Benefits Schemes (Continuation of Rights of Members of Approved Schemes) (Amendment) Regulations 1993 (S.I. 1993/3220)
 Retirement Benefits Schemes (Tax Relief on Contributions) (Disapplication of Earnings Cap) (Amendment) Regulations 1993 (S.I. 1993/3221)
 Exempt Entertainments (Variation of Monetary Limit) Order 1993 (S.I. 1993/3222)
 Lotteries Regulations 1993 (S.I. 1993/3223)
 Lotteries (Gaming Board Fees) Order 1993 (S.I. 1993/3224)
 Banking Coordination (Second Council Directive) (Amendment) Regulations 1993 (S.I. 1993/3225)
 Friendly Societies Act 1992 (Commencement No. 7 and Transitional Provisions and Savings) Order 1993 (S.I. 1993/3226)
 Utilities Supply and Works Contracts (Amendment) Regulations 1993 (S.I. 1993/3227)
 Public Services Contracts Regulations 1993 (S.I. 1993/3228)
 Land Registration Fees Order 1993 (S.I. 1993/3229)
 Milk Marketing Board Scheme of Reorganisation (Extension of Period for Application) Order 1993 (S.I. 1993/3230)
 Merchant Shipping (Musters and Training) (Amendment) Regulations 1993 (S.I. 1993/3231)
 Merchant Shipping (Pilot Ladders and Hoists) (Amendment) Regulations 1993 (S.I. 1993/3232)
 Dairy Produce Quotas (Amendment) Regulations 1993 (S.I. 1993/3234)
 Pensions Increase (Approved Schemes) (National Health Service) (Scotland) Amendment Regulations 1993 (S.I. 1993/3235)
 Council Tax (Transitional Reduction Scheme) (Scotland) (No.2) Regulations 1993 (S.I. 1993/3236)
 Railways Act 1993 (Commencement No. 1) Order 1993 (S.I. 1993/3237)
 Road Traffic Act 1991 (Commencement No. 9 and Transitional Provisions) Order 1993 (S.I. 1993/3238)
 Road Traffic (Special Parking Areas) (London Boroughs of Richmond upon Thames and Southwark) Order 1993 (S.I. 1993/3239)
 Act of Sederunt (Sheriff Court Summary Application Rules) 1993 (S.I. 1993/3240)
 Insurance Accounts Directive (Miscellaneous Insurance Undertakings) Regulations 1993 (S.I. 1993/3245)
 Companies Act 1985 (Insurance Companies Accounts) Regulations 1993 (S.I. 1993/3246)
 Animals and Animal Products (Import and Export) Regulations 1993 (S.I. 1993/3247)
 Artificial Breeding of Sheep and Goats Regulations 1993 (S.I. 1993/3248)
 Importation of Bees (Amendment) Order 1993 (S.I. 1993/3249)
 Specified Animal Pathogens Order 1993 (S.I. 1993/3250)
 Parliamentary Pensions (Additional Voluntary Contributions Scheme) Regulations 1993 (S.I. 1993/3252)
 Parliamentary Pensions (Consolidation and Amendment) Regulations 1993 (S.I. 1993/3253)
 Customs Duties (ECSC) (Quota and other Reliefs) Order 1993 (S.I. 1993/3254)
 Medicines (Products Other Than Veterinary Drugs) (Prescription Only) Amendment (No. 2) Order 1993 (S.I. 1993/3256)
 Tribunals and Inquiries (Friendly Societies) Order 1993 (S.I. 1993/3258)
 Cardiff—Glan Conwy Trunk Road (A470) (Pentrebach—Cefn Coed Diversion) Order 1993 (S.I. 1993/3259)
 London Borough of Hackney (Lea Bridge-Cycle/Footbridge) Scheme 1993 Confirmation Instrument 1993 (S.I. 1993/3260)
 M42 Motorway (Junction 6 Southbound Off-Slip Road to Eastway) Scheme 1993 (S.I. 1993/3261)
 Export of Goods (Control) (Amendment No. 6) Order 1993 (S.I. 1993/3264)
 County Court (Amendment No. 4) Rules 1993 (S.I. 1993/3273)
 Land Registration Rules 1993 (S.I. 1993/3275)
 Land Registration (Official Searches) Rules 1993 (S.I. 1993/3276)

See also
List of Statutory Instruments of the United Kingdom

External links
Legislation.gov.uk delivered by the UK National Archive
UK SI's on legislation.gov.uk
UK Draft SI's on legislation.gov.uk

Lists of Statutory Instruments of the United Kingdom
Statutory Instruments